= WAIC =

WAIC or Waic may refer to:

- Waic languages, a family of languages spoken in Asia
- WAIC (FM), a radio station in Springfield, Massachusetts, USA
- Widely applicable information criterion, a concept in statistical science
- World Artificial Intelligence Conference, an annual conference in Shanghai, China
