= Relative likelihood =

Statistical model tool

In statistics, when selecting a statistical model for given data, the relative likelihood compares the relative plausibilities of different candidate models or of different values of a parameter of a single model.

== Relative likelihood of parameter values ==
Assume that we are given some data x for which we have a statistical model with parameter θ. Suppose that the maximum likelihood estimate for θ is $\hat{\theta}$. Relative plausibilities of other θ values may be found by comparing the likelihoods of those other values with the likelihood of $\hat{\theta}$. The relative likelihood of θ is defined to be
$$\frac{~\mathcal{L}(\theta \mid x)~}{~\mathcal{L}(\hat{\theta} \mid x)~},$$
where $\mathcal{L}(\theta \mid x)$ denotes the likelihood function. Thus, the relative likelihood is the likelihood ratio with fixed denominator $\mathcal{L}(\hat{\theta} \mid x)$.

The function
$$\theta \mapsto \frac{~\mathcal{L}(\theta \mid x)~}{~\mathcal{L}(\hat{\theta} \mid x)~}$$
is the relative likelihood function.

=== Likelihood region ===
A likelihood region is the set of all values of θ whose relative likelihood is greater than or equal to a given threshold. In terms of percentages, a p% likelihood region for θ is defined to be.

$$\left\{\theta : \frac{\mathcal{L}(\theta \mid x)}{\mathcal{L}(\hat{\theta\,} \mid x)} \ge \frac p {100} \right\}.$$

If θ is a single real parameter, a p% likelihood region will usually comprise an interval of real values. If the region does comprise an interval, then it is called a likelihood interval.

Likelihood intervals, and more generally likelihood regions, are used for interval estimation within likelihood-based statistics ("likelihoodist" statistics): They are similar to confidence intervals in frequentist statistics and credible intervals in Bayesian statistics. Likelihood intervals are interpreted directly in terms of relative likelihood, not in terms of coverage probability (frequentism) or posterior probability (Bayesianism).

Given a model, likelihood intervals can be compared to confidence intervals. If θ is a single real parameter, then under certain conditions, a 14.65% likelihood interval (about 1:7 likelihood) for θ will be the same as a 95% confidence interval (19/20 coverage probability). In a slightly different formulation suited to the use of log-likelihoods (see Wilks' theorem), the test statistic is twice the difference in log-likelihoods and the probability distribution of the test statistic is approximately a chi-squared distribution with degrees-of-freedom (df) equal to the difference in df-s between the two models (therefore, the e^{−2} likelihood interval is the same as the 0.954 confidence interval; assuming difference in df-s to be 1).

== Relative likelihood of models ==
The definition of relative likelihood can be generalized to compare different statistical models. This generalization is based on AIC (Akaike information criterion), or sometimes AICc (Akaike Information Criterion with correction).

Suppose that for some given data we have two statistical models, M_{1} and M_{2}. Also suppose that AIC(M_{1}) ≤ AIC(M_{2}). Then the relative likelihood of M_{2} with respect to M_{1} is defined as follows.

$$\exp \left( \frac{\operatorname{AIC}(M_1)-\operatorname{AIC}(M_2)}{2} \right)$$

To see that this is a generalization of the earlier definition, suppose that we have some model M with a (possibly multivariate) parameter θ. Then for any θ, set M_{2} = M(θ), and also set M_{1} = M($\hat\theta$). The general definition now gives the same result as the earlier definition.

== See also ==
- Statistical model selection
- Statistical model specification
- Statistical model validation
