= Deviance (statistics) =

Measure of goodness of fit for a statistical model

In statistics, deviance is a goodness-of-fit statistic for a statistical model; it is often used for statistical hypothesis testing. It is a generalization of the idea of using the sum of squares of residuals (SSR) in ordinary least squares to cases where model-fitting is achieved by maximum likelihood. It plays an important role in exponential dispersion models and generalized linear models.

Deviance can be related to Kullback–Leibler divergence.

== Definition ==
The unit deviance $d(y,\mu)$ is a bivariate function that satisfies the following conditions:

- $d(y,y) = 0$
- $d(y,\mu) > 0 \quad\forall y \neq \mu$

The total deviance $D(\mathbf{y},\hat{\boldsymbol{\mu}})$ of a model with predictions $\hat{\boldsymbol{\mu}}$ of the observation $\mathbf{y}$ is the sum of its unit deviances: $D(\mathbf{y},\hat{\boldsymbol{\mu}}) = \sum_i d(y_i, \hat{\mu}_i)$.

The (total) deviance for a model M_{0} with estimates $\hat{\mu} = E[Y|\hat{\theta}_0]$, based on a dataset y, may be constructed by its likelihood as:
$$D(y,\hat{\mu}) = 2 \left(\log \left[p(y\mid\hat \theta_s)\right] - \log \left[ p(y\mid\hat \theta_0)\right]\right).$$

Here $\hat \theta_0$ denotes the fitted values of the parameters in the model M_{0}, while $\hat \theta_s$ denotes the fitted parameters for the saturated model: both sets of fitted values are implicitly functions of the observations y. Here, the saturated model is a model with a parameter for every observation so that the data are fitted exactly. This expression is simply 2 times the log-likelihood ratio of the full model compared to the reduced model. The deviance is used to compare two models – in particular in the case of generalized linear models (GLM) where it has a similar role to residual sum of squares from ANOVA in linear models (RSS).

Suppose in the framework of the GLM, we have two nested models, M_{1} and M_{2}. In particular, suppose that M_{1} contains the parameters in M_{2}, and k additional parameters. Then, under the null hypothesis that M_{2} is the true model, the difference between the deviances for the two models follows, based on Wilks' theorem, an approximate chi-squared distribution with k-degrees of freedom. This can be used for hypothesis testing on the deviance.

Some usage of the term "deviance" can be confusing. According to Collett:

"the quantity $-2 \log \big[ p(y\mid\hat \theta_0)\big]$ is sometimes referred to as a deviance. This is [...] inappropriate, since unlike the deviance used in the context of generalized linear modelling, $-2 \log \big[ p(y\mid\hat \theta_0)\big]$ does not measure deviation from a model that is a perfect fit to the data."

However, since the principal use is in the form of the difference of the deviances of two models, this confusion in definition is usually unimportant.

== Examples ==
The unit deviance for the Poisson distribution is $d(y,\mu) = 2\left(y\log\frac{y}{\mu}-y+\mu\right)$, the unit deviance for the normal distribution with unit variance is given by $d(y,\mu) = \left(y-\mu\right)^2$.

== See also ==
- Akaike information criterion
- Deviance information criterion
- Hosmer–Lemeshow test, a quality of fit statistic that can be used for binary data
- Pearson's chi-squared test, an alternative quality of fit statistic for generalized linear models for count data
- Peirce's criterion, a rule for eliminating outliers from data sets
