= Gerda Claeskens =

Belgian statistician

- Citizenship: Belgian
- Education: University of Antwerp 1995 (licentiate in mathematics), Limburgs Universitair Centrum 1999 (master's degree in biostatistics), Limburgs Universitair Centrum (Ph.D. in mathematics), Australian National University postdoctoral research
- Occupation: Statistician
- Employer(s): KU Leuven, Eindhoven University of Technology, Texas A&M University
- Known for: developing focused information criterion for model selection
- Notable work: Expert in nonparametric statistics and model selection
- Awards: Noether Young Scholar Award of the American Statistical Association

Gerda Claeskens is a Belgian statistician. She is a professor of statistics in the Faculty of Economics and Business at KU Leuven, associated with the KU Research Centre for Operations Research and Business Statistics (ORSTAT).

== Contributions ==
Claeskens is an expert in nonparametric statistics and in model selection, including model averaging. She is known for developing, with Nils Lid Hjort, the focused information criterion for model selection. With Hjort, she is the author of the book Model Selection and Model Averaging (Cambridge University Press, 2008).

== Education and career ==
Claeskens earned a licentiate in mathematics at the University of Antwerp in 1995. In 1999, she earned a master's degree in biostatistics and Ph.D. in mathematics, at Limburgs Universitair Centrum (now the University of Hasselt); her dissertation, supervised by Marc Aerts, was Smoothing Techniques and Bootstrap Methods for Multiparameter Likelihood. She did postdoctoral research at the Australian National University. Afterwards, she was an assistant professor at the Eindhoven University of Technology (from 1999 to 2000) and at Texas A&M University (from 2000 to 2004). She joined the KU Leuven faculty in 2004, and was promoted to full professor there in 2012.

== Recognition ==
In 2004, Claeskens won the Noether Young Scholar Award of the American Statistical Association. She is an elected member of the International Statistical Institute. In 2012 she was elected as a Fellow of the Institute of Mathematical Statistics, and in 2016 she was a Medallion Lecturer for the Institute, speaking about her work on model selection and model averaging. In 2019 she was elected as a Fellow of the American Statistical Association.
