= Widely applicable information criterion =

Concept in statistical science

In statistical science, the widely applicable information criterion (WAIC), also known as the Watanabe–Akaike information criterion, is the generalized version of the Akaike information criterion (AIC) onto singular statistical models. It is used as measure of how well the model will predict data it wasn't trained on. It is asymptotically equivalent to cross-validation loss. Lower values of WAIC correspond to better performance.

If we take log pointwise predictive density:

$$\text{lppd}(y, \Theta) = \sum_{i} \log \frac{1}{S} \sum_{s} p(y_i \mid \Theta_s)$$

Then:

$$\text{WAIC}(y, \Theta) = -2 \left( \text{lppd} - \underbrace{\sum_{i} \operatorname{Var}_{\theta} \log p(y_i \mid \theta)}_{\text{penalty term}} \right)$$

Where $y$ is predicted output in training data. Θ is models posterior distribution, $s$ are samples from posterior, and i iterates over training data.

In other words, in Bayesian statistics the posterior is represented by list of samples from it. WAIC penalty is then the variance of predictions among these samples, calculated and added for each datapoint from dataset.

The penalty term is often referred to as the "effective number of parameters". This terminology stems from historical conventions, as a similar term is used in the Akaike Information Criterion.

Watanabe recommends in practice calculating both WAIC and PSIS – Pareto Smoothed Importance Sampling. Both are approximations of leave-one-out cross-validation. If they disagree then at least one of them is not reliable. Similarly PSIS can sometimes detect if its estimate is not reliable (if $\hat{k}$ > 0.7).

Some textbooks of Bayesian statistics recommend WAIC over other information criteria, especially for multilevel and mixture models.

Widely applicable Bayesian information criterion (WBIC) is the generalized version of Bayesian information criterion (BIC) onto singular statistical models.

WBIC is the average log likelihood function over the posterior distribution with the inverse temperature > 1/log n where n is the sample size.

Both WAIC and WBIC can be numerically calculated without any information about a true distribution.

== See also ==
- Akaike information criterion
- Bayesian information criterion
- Deviance information criterion
- Hannan–Quinn information criterion
