= Statistical model validation =

Evaluating whether a chosen statistical model is appropriate or not

In statistics, model validation is the task of evaluating whether a chosen statistical model is appropriate or not. Oftentimes in statistical inference, inferences from models that appear to fit their data may be flukes, resulting in a misunderstanding by researchers of the actual relevance of their model. To combat this, model validation is used to test whether a statistical model can hold up to permutations in the data. Model validation is also called model criticism or model evaluation.

This topic is not to be confused with the closely related task of model selection, the process of discriminating between multiple candidate models: model validation does not concern so much the conceptual design of models as it tests only the consistency between a chosen model and its stated outputs.

There are many ways to validate a model. Residual plots plot the difference between the actual data and the model's predictions: correlations in the residual plots may indicate a flaw in the model. Cross validation is a method of model validation that iteratively refits the model, each time leaving out just a small sample and comparing whether the samples left out are predicted by the model: there are many kinds of cross validation. Predictive simulation is used to compare simulated data to actual data. External validation involves fitting the model to new data. Akaike information criterion estimates the quality of a model.

== Overview ==
Model validation comes in many forms and the specific method of model validation a researcher uses is often a constraint of their research design. To emphasize, what this means is that there is no one-size-fits-all method to validating a model. For example, if a researcher is operating with a very limited set of data, but data they have strong prior assumptions about, they may consider validating the fit of their model by using a Bayesian framework and testing the fit of their model using various prior distributions. However, if a researcher has a lot of data and is testing multiple nested models, these conditions may lend themselves toward cross validation and possibly a leave one out test. These are two abstract examples and any actual model validation will have to consider far more intricacies than described here but these examples illustrate that model validation methods are always going to be circumstantial.

In general, models can be validated using existing data or with new data, and both methods are discussed more in the following subsections, and a note of caution is provided, too.

=== Validation with existing data ===
Validation based on existing data involves analyzing the goodness of fit of the model or analyzing whether the residuals seem to be random (i.e. residual diagnostics). This method involves using analyses of the model's closeness to the data and trying to understand how well the model predicts its own data. One example of this method is in Figure 1, which shows a polynomial function fit to some data. We see that the polynomial function does not conform well to the data, which appears linear, and might invalidate this polynomial model.

Commonly, statistical models on existing data are validated using a validation set, which may also be referred to as a holdout set. A validation set is a set of data points that the user leaves out when fitting a statistical model. After the statistical model is fitted, the validation set is used as a measure of the model's error. If the model fits well on the initial data but has a large error on the validation set, this is a sign of overfitting.

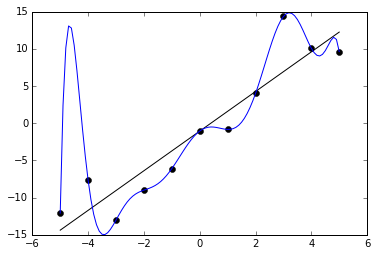
Data (black dots), which was generated via the straight line and some added noise, is perfectly fitted by a curvy polynomial.

=== Validation with new data ===
If new data becomes available, an existing model can be validated by assessing whether the new data is predicted by the old model. If the new data is not predicted by the old model, then the model might not be valid for the researcher's goals.

With this in mind, a modern approach is to validate a neural network is to test its performance on domain-shifted data. This ascertains if the model learned domain-invariant features.

=== A note of caution ===
A model can be validated only relative to some application area. A model that is valid for one application might be invalid for some other applications. As an example, consider the curve in Figure 1: if the application only used inputs from the interval [0, 2], then the curve might well be an acceptable model.

== Methods for validating ==
When doing a validation, there are three notable causes of potential difficulty, according to the Encyclopedia of Statistical Sciences. The three causes are these: lack of data; lack of control of the input variables; uncertainty about the underlying probability distributions and correlations. The usual methods for dealing with difficulties in validation include the following: checking the assumptions made in constructing the model; examining the available data and related model outputs; applying expert judgment. Note that expert judgment commonly requires expertise in the application area.

Expert judgment can sometimes be used to assess the validity of a prediction without obtaining real data: e.g. for the curve in Figure 1, an expert might well be able to assess that a substantial extrapolation will be invalid. Additionally, expert judgment can be used in Turing-type tests, where experts are presented with both real data and related model outputs and then asked to distinguish between the two.

For some classes of statistical models, specialized methods of performing validation are available. As an example, if the statistical model was obtained via a regression, then specialized analyses for regression model validation exist and are generally employed.

=== Residual diagnostics ===
Residual diagnostics comprise analyses of the residuals to determine whether the residuals seem to be effectively random. Such analyses typically requires estimates of the probability distributions for the residuals. Estimates of the residuals' distributions can often be obtained by repeatedly running the model, i.e. by using repeated stochastic simulations (employing a pseudorandom number generator for random variables in the model).

If the statistical model was obtained via a regression, then regression-residual diagnostics exist and may be used; such diagnostics have been well studied.

=== Cross validation ===
Cross validation is a method of sampling that involves leaving some parts of the data out of the fitting process and then seeing whether those data that are left out are close or far away from where the model predicts they would be. What that means practically is that cross validation techniques fit the model many, many times with a portion of the data and compares each model fit to the portion it did not use. If the models very rarely describe the data that they were not trained on, then the model is probably wrong.

A recent development in medical statistics is the use of a cross-validation metric in meta-analysis. It forms the basis of the validation statistic, Vn which is used to test the statistical validity of meta-analysis summary estimates. It has also been used in a more conventional sense in meta-analysis to estimate the likely prediction error of meta-analysis results.

== See also ==
- All models are wrong – Aphorism in statistics
- Identifiability analysis – Methods in mathematical statistics
- Internal validity – Extent to which a piece of evidence supports a claim about cause and effect
- Model identification – Statistical property which a model must satisfy to allow precise inference
- Perplexity – Concept in information theory
- Predictive model – Form of modelling that uses statistics to predict outcomes
- Sensitivity analysis – Study of uncertainty in the output of a mathematical model or system
- Spurious relationship – Apparent, but false, correlation between causally-independent variables
- Statistical conclusion validity
- Statistical model selection – Task of selecting a statistical model from a set of candidate models
- Statistical model specification – Part of the process of building a statistical model
- Validity (statistics) – Extent to which a measurement corresponds to reality
