= Birnbaum's theorem =

Theorem in statistics regarding the Likelihood Principle

Birnbaum's Theorem is a pivotal result in the foundations of statistics, formulated by the American statistician Allan Birnbaum in 1962. The theorem formally demonstrates that the likelihood principle is logically equivalent to the combination of two more widely accepted statistical principles: the sufficiency principle and the conditionality principle.

The publication of the theorem in the Journal of the American Statistical Association was a landmark event that sparked intense debate between frequentist and Bayesian statisticians, as the likelihood principle implies that many standard frequentist methods (such as p-values and confidence intervals) violate basic axioms of consistency.

== Definitions and principles ==
Birnbaum's theorem concerns the "evidential meaning" of an experiment, denoted as $\text{Ev}(E, x)$, where $E$ is the experiment and $x$ is the observed data.

=== Sufficiency principle (S) ===
The sufficiency principle states that if $T(x)$ is a sufficient statistic for a parameter $\theta$, then the evidential meaning of the data $x$ is the same as the evidential meaning of the statistic $T(x)$. Formally:

$$\text{Ev}(E, x) = \text{Ev}(E, T(x))$$

This principle is widely accepted by almost all statistical schools of thought.

=== Conditionality principle (C) ===
The conditionality principle states that if an experiment is chosen by a random mechanism (such as a coin flip) that does not depend on the parameter $\theta$, then the evidence provided by the result depends only on the experiment actually performed. For example, if a researcher decides to perform either experiment $E_1$ or $E_2$ based on a fair coin toss, and $E_1$ is chosen, the evidence $\text{Ev}$ should not be affected by the fact that $E_2$ "could have" been performed.

=== Likelihood principle (L) ===
The likelihood principle states that all the information about $\theta$ from an experiment is contained in the likelihood function $L(\theta) = f(x\mid \theta)$. Two different experiments yielding the same likelihood function (up to a multiplicative constant) should result in the same inference about $\theta$.

== The theorem ==
Birnbaum's theorem states:

The likelihood principle (L) is equivalent to the conjunction of the sufficiency principle (S) and the conditionality principle (C).

Symbolically:

$$(S \text{ and } C) \iff L$$

=== Significance ===
While (S) is viewed as intuitively obvious by many statisticians, there are severe reservations about the suitability of (C), in particular with the equivalence format used in (C). By 1969, Birnbaum had rejected both his (C) and the likelihood principle (L). (L) implies that the stopping rule of an experiment (for example, whether a researcher decided to stop after 10 trials or after seeing 3 successes) should not affect the final inference—a direct contradiction to how p-values are calculated.

== Criticisms ==
Following Birnbaum's original paper, several statisticians challenged the proof.

- Deborah Mayo argued in 2004 that Birnbaum's application of the conditionality principle was flawed because it assumes the existence of an "evidential" framework that may not be compatible with frequentist goals of error control.
- Michael Evans and others have revisited the proof using different categorical frameworks, generally upholding Birmbaum's logic while noting that the "evidence" $\text{Ev}$ must be carefully defined to avoid mathematical trivialities.

== See also ==
- Experimental design
- Foundations of statistics
- Likelihood principle
- Sufficient statistic
