= Foundations of statistics =

Concepts underlying statistical methods

The Foundations of Statistics are the mathematical and philosophical bases for statistical methods. These bases are the theoretical frameworks that ground and justify methods of statistical inference, estimation, hypothesis testing, uncertainty quantification, and the interpretation of statistical conclusions. Further, a foundation can be used to explain statistical paradoxes, provide descriptions of statistical laws, and guide the application of statistics to real-world problems.

Different statistical foundations may provide different, contrasting perspectives on the analysis and interpretation of data, and some of these contrasts have been subject to centuries of debate. Examples include the Bayesian inference versus frequentist inference; the distinction between Fisher's significance testing and the Neyman-Pearson hypothesis testing; and whether the likelihood principle holds.

Certain frameworks may be preferred for specific applications, such as the use of Bayesian methods in fitting complex ecological models.

Bandyopadhyay & Forster identify four statistical paradigms: classical statistics (error statistics), Bayesian statistics, likelihood-based statistics, and information-based statistics using the Akaike Information Criterion. More recently, Judea Pearl reintroduced formal mathematics by attributing causality in statistical systems that addressed the fundamental limitations of both Bayesian and Neyman-Pearson methods, as discussed in his book Causality.

== Fisher's "significance testing" vs. Neyman–Pearson "hypothesis testing" ==
During the 20th century, the development of classical statistics led to the emergence of two competing foundations for inductive statistical testing. The merits of these models were extensively debated. While a hybrid of the two methods is widely taught and used, the philosophical questions raised in the debate have not been resolved..

=== Significance testing ===
Fisher popularized significance testing with Statistical Methods for Research Workers, published in 1925, and The Design of Experiments, published in 1935. Fisher was motivated to obtain scientific experimental results without the explicit influence of prior opinion. The significance test is a probabilistic version of modus tollens, a classic form of deductive inference. The significance test might be simplistically stated, "If the evidence is sufficiently discordant with the hypothesis, reject the hypothesis". In application, a statistic is calculated from the experimental data, and the probability of exceeding that statistic under a default or 'null' model is compared to a threshold. The threshold (the numeric version of "sufficiently discordant") is arbitrary (usually decided by convention). A common application of the method is deciding whether a treatment has a reportable effect based on a comparative experiment. The null hypothesis then corresponds to the model with no treatment effect, implying the treated and the controls come from the same population. Statistical significance is a measure of probability, not practical importance. It can be regarded as a requirement placed on statistical signal/noise. Note that the test cannot prove the hypothesis (of no treatment effect), but only provide more or less evidence against it. The method is based on the formulation of an imaginary infinite population (i.e. a specified statistical model) corresponding to the null hypothesis.

The Fisherian significance test involves only one hypothesis, but the choice of test statistic requires at least a feeling for relevant directions of deviation from the hypothesis model. Historically, the result of the test was either to reject the hypothesis or not, whereas nowadays the probability of observing the test results assuming the hypothesis can be calculated with the aid of computers, which was impossible in Fisher's day. This probability, known as the p-value, allows for a more precise assessment of the significance of the result.

=== Hypothesis testing ===
Neyman & Pearson collaborated on a different, but related, problem – selecting among competing hypotheses based on the experimental evidence alone. Of their joint papers, the most cited is from 1933. The famous result of that paper is the Neyman–Pearson lemma. The lemma says that a ratio of probabilities is an excellent criterion for selecting a hypothesis (with the threshold for comparison being arbitrary). The paper proved an optimality of Student's t-test (one of the significance tests). Neyman expressed the opinion that hypothesis testing was a generalization of and an improvement on significance testing. The rationale for their methods is found in their joint papers.

Hypothesis testing requires multiple hypotheses. A hypothesis is always selected, a multiple choice. A lack of evidence is not an immediate consideration. The method is based on the assumption of repeated sampling of the same population (the classical frequentist assumption), although Fisher criticized this assumption (Rubin, 2020).

=== Grounds of disagreement ===
The length of the dispute allowed the debate of a wide range of issues regarded as foundational to statistics.

==== Fisher's attack ====
Repeated sampling of the same population

- Such sampling is the basis of frequentist probability
- Fisher preferred fiducial inference

Type II errors

- Which result from an alternative hypothesis

Inductive behavior

- (Vs inductive reasoning)

==== Neyman's rebuttal ====
Fisher's attack on inductive behavior has been largely successful because he selected the field of battle. While operational decisions are routinely made on a variety of criteria (such as cost), scientific conclusions from experimentation are typically made based on probability alone. Fisher's theory of fiduciary inference is flawed

- Paradoxes are common

A purely probabilistic theory of tests requires an alternative hypothesis. Fisher's attacks on Type II errors have faded with time. In the intervening years, statistics have separated the exploratory from the confirmatory. In the current environment, the concept of Type II errors are used in power calculations for confirmatory hypothesis tests' sample size determination.

==== Discussion ====
Fisher's attack based on frequentist probability failed but was not without result. He identified a specific case (2×2 table) where the two schools of testing reached different results. This case is one of several that are still troubling. Commentators believe that the "right" answer is context-dependent. Fiducial probability has not fared well, being virtually without advocates, while frequentist probability remains a mainstream interpretation.

Fisher's attack on inductive behavior has been largely successful because he selected the field of battle. While ''operational decisions'' are routinely made on a variety of criteria (such as cost), ''scientific conclusions'' from experimentation are typically made based on probability alone.

In this exchange, Fisher also discussed the requirements for inductive inference, with specific criticism of cost functions penalizing faulty judgments. Neyman countered that Gauss and Laplace used them. This exchange of arguments occurred 15 years after textbooks began teaching a hybrid theory of statistical testing.

Fisher and Neyman were in disagreement about the foundations of statistics (although united in vehement opposition to the Bayesian view):

- The interpretation of probability
  - The disagreement between Fisher's inductive reasoning and Neyman's inductive behavior contained elements of the Bayesian-Frequentist divide. Fisher was willing to revise his opinion (reaching a provisional conclusion) based on calculated probability, while Neyman was more inclined to adjust his observable behavior (making a decision) based on computed costs.
- The appropriate formulation of scientific questions, with a particular focus on modelling
- Whether it is justifiable to reject a hypothesis based on a low probability without knowing the probability of an alternative
- Whether a hypothesis could ever be accepted based solely on data
  - In mathematics, deduction proves, while counter-examples disprove.
  - In the Popperian philosophy of science, progress is made when theories are disproven.
- Subjectivity: While Fisher and Neyman struggled to minimize subjectivity, both acknowledged the importance of "good judgment". Each accused the other of subjectivity.
  - Fisher subjectively selected the null hypothesis.
  - Neyman-Pearson subjectively determined the criterion for selection (which was not limited to probability).
  - Both subjectively established numeric thresholds.

Fisher and Neyman were separated by attitudes and perhaps language. Fisher was a scientist and an intuitive mathematician. Inductive reasoning was natural. Neyman was a rigorous mathematician. He was convinced by deductive reasoning rather than by a probability calculation based on an experiment. Thus there was an underlying clash between applied and theoretical (between science and mathematics).

=== Related history ===
Neyman, who had occupied the same building in England as Fisher, accepted a position on the West coast of the United States of America in 1938. His move effectively ended his collaboration with Pearson and their development of hypothesis testing. Further development was continued by others.

Textbooks provided a hybrid version of significance and hypothesis testing by 1940. None of the principals had any known personal involvement in the further development of the hybrid taught in introductory statistics today.

Statistics later developed in different directions including decision theory (and possibly game theory), Bayesian statistics, exploratory data analysis, robust statistics, and nonparametric statistics. Neyman–Pearson hypothesis testing contributed strongly to decision theory which is very heavily used (in statistical quality control for example). Hypothesis testing readily generalized to accept prior probabilities which gave it a Bayesian flavor.

Neyman–Pearson hypothesis testing has become an abstract mathematical subject taught in post-graduate statistics, while most of what is taught to under-graduates and used under the banner of hypothesis testing is from Fisher.

=== Contemporary opinion ===
The hybrid of the two competing schools of testing can be viewed differently: as the imperfect union of two mathematically complementary ideas or as the fundamentally flawed union of philosophically incompatible ideas. Fisher enjoyed some philosophical advantage, while Neyman & Pearson employed the more rigorous mathematics. Hypothesis testing is controversial among some users, but the most popular alternative (confidence intervals) is based on the same mathematics.

The history of the development left testing without a single citable authoritative source for the hybrid theory that reflects common statistical practice. The merged terminology is also somewhat inconsistent. There is strong empirical evidence that the graduates (and instructors) of an introductory statistics class have a weak understanding of the meaning of hypothesis testing.

=== Summary ===
- The interpretation of probability has not been resolved (but the fiducial probability is an orphan).
- Neither test method has been rejected. Both are heavily used for different purposes.
- Texts have merged the two test methods under the term hypothesis testing.
  - Mathematicians claim (with some exceptions) that significance tests are a special case of hypothesis tests.
  - Others treat the problems and methods as distinct (or incompatible).
- The dispute has adversely affected statistical education.

== Bayesian inference versus frequentist inference ==
Two different interpretations of probability (based on objective evidence and subjective degrees of belief) have long existed. Gauss and Laplace could have debated alternatives more than 200 years ago. Two competing schools of statistics have developed as a consequence. Classical inferential statistics was largely developed in the second quarter of the 20th century, much of it in reaction to the (Bayesian) probability of the time which utilized the controversial principle of indifference to establish prior probabilities. The rehabilitation of Bayesian inference was a reaction to the limitations of frequentist probability. More reactions followed. While the philosophical interpretations are old, the statistical terminology is not. The current statistical terms "Bayesian" and "frequentist" stabilized in the second half of the 20th century. The (philosophical, mathematical, scientific, statistical) terminology is confusing: the "classical" interpretation of probability is Bayesian while "classical" statistics is frequentist. "Frequentist" also has varying interpretations—different in philosophy than in physics.

The nuances of philosophical probability interpretations are discussed elsewhere. In statistics, the alternative interpretations enable the analysis of different data using different methods based on different models to achieve slightly different goals. Any statistical comparison of the competing schools considers pragmatic criteria beyond the philosophical.

=== Major contributors ===
Two major contributors to frequentist (classical) methods were Fisher and Neyman. Fisher's interpretation of probability was idiosyncratic (but strongly non-Bayesian). Neyman's views were rigorously frequentist. Three major contributors to 20th century Bayesian statistical philosophy, mathematics, and methods were de Finetti, Jeffreys and Savage. Savage popularized de Finetti's ideas in the English-speaking world and made Bayesian mathematics rigorous. In 1965, Dennis Lindley's 2 volume work "Introduction to Probability and Statistics from a Bayesian Viewpoint" brought Bayesian methods to a wide audience. Statistics has advanced over the past three generations. The "authoritative" views of the early contributors are not all current.

=== Contrasting approaches ===
==== Frequentist inference ====
Frequentist inference is partially and tersely described above in (Fisher's "significance testing" vs. Neyman–Pearson "hypothesis testing"). Frequentist inference combines several different views. The result is capable of supporting scientific conclusions, making operational decisions, and estimating parameters with or without confidence intervals. Frequentist inference is based solely on (one set of) evidence.

==== Bayesian inference ====
A classical frequency distribution describes the probability of the data. The use of Bayes' theorem allows a more abstract concept – the probability of a hypothesis (corresponding to a theory) given the data. The concept was once known as "inverse probability". Bayesian inference updates the probability estimate for a hypothesis as additional evidence is acquired. Bayesian inference is explicitly based on the evidence and prior opinion, which allows it to be based on multiple sets of evidence.

==== Comparisons of characteristics ====
Frequentists and Bayesians use different models of probability. Frequentists often consider parameters to be fixed but unknown while Bayesians assign probability distributions to similar parameters. Consequently, Bayesians speak of probabilities that don't exist for frequentists; a Bayesian speaks of the probability of a theory while a true frequentist can speak only of the consistency of the evidence with the theory. Example: A frequentist does not say that there is a 95% probability that the true value of a parameter lies within a confidence interval, saying instead that 95% of confidence intervals contain the true value.

Efron's comparative adjectives
	Bayesian	Frequentist
Basis	Belief (prior)	Behavior (method)
Resulting Characteristic	Principled Philosophy	Opportunistic Methods
Distributions	One distribution	Many distributions (bootstrap?)
Ideal Application	Dynamic (repeated sampling)	Static (one sample)
Target Audience	Individual (subjective)	Community (objective)
Modeling Characteristic	Aggressive	Defensive

Alternative comparison
	Bayesian	Frequentist
Strengths	Complete; Coherent; Prescriptive; Strong inference from model	Inferences well calibrated; No need to specify prior distributions; Flexible range of procedures; Strong model formulation & assessment; Unbiasness, sufficiency, ancillary...; Widely applicable and dependable; Asymptotic theory; Easy to interpret; Can be calculated by hand
Weaknesses	Too subjective for scientific inference; Denies the role of randomization in design; Requires and relies on full specification of a model (likelihood and prior); Weak model formulation & assessment	Incomplete; Ambiguous; Incoherent; Not prescriptive; No unified theory; Potential overemphasis on asymptotic properties; Weak inference from model

=== Mathematical results ===
Neither school is immune from mathematical criticism and neither accepts it without a struggle. Stein's paradox (for example) illustrated that finding a "flat" or "uninformative" prior probability distribution in high dimensions is subtle. Bayesians regard that as peripheral to the core of their philosophy while finding frequentism to be riddled with inconsistencies, paradoxes, and bad mathematical behavior. Frequentists can explain most. Some of the "bad" examples are extreme situations - such as estimating the weight of a herd of elephants from measuring the weight of one ("Basu's elephants"), which allows no statistical estimate of the variability of weights. The likelihood principle has been a battleground.

=== Statistical results ===
Both schools have achieved impressive results in solving real-world problems. Classical statistics effectively has a longer record because numerous results were obtained with mechanical calculators and printed tables of special statistical functions. Bayesian methods have been highly successful in the analysis of information that is naturally sequentially sampled (radar and sonar). Many Bayesian methods and some recent frequentist methods (such as the bootstrap) require the computational power widely available only in the last several decades. There is active discussion about combining Bayesian and frequentist methods, but reservations are expressed about the meaning of the results and reducing the diversity of approaches.

=== Philosophical results ===
Bayesians are united in opposition to the limitations of frequentism but are philosophically divided into numerous camps (empirical, hierarchical, objective, personal, subjective), each with a different emphasis. One (frequentist) philosopher of statistics has noted a retreat from the statistical field to philosophical probability interpretations over the last two generations. There is a perception that successes in Bayesian applications do not justify the supporting philosophy. Bayesian methods often create useful models that are not used for traditional inference and which owe little to philosophy. None of the philosophical interpretations of probability (frequentist or Bayesian) appears robust. The frequentist view is too rigid and limiting while the Bayesian view can be simultaneously objective and subjective, etc.

=== Illustrative quotations ===
- "Carefully used, the frequentist approach yields broadly applicable if sometimes clumsy answers"
- "To insist on unbiased [frequent] techniques may lead to negative (but unbiased) estimates of variance; the use of p-values in multiple tests may lead to blatant contradictions; conventional 0.95 confidence regions may consist of the whole real line. No wonder that mathematicians find it often difficult to believe that conventional statistical methods are a branch of mathematics."
- "Bayesianism is a neat and fully principled philosophy, while frequentist is a grab-bag of opportunistic, individually optimal, methods."
- "In multiparameter problems flat priors can yield very bad answers"
- "Bayes' rule says there is a simple, elegant way to combine current information with prior experience to state how much is known. It implies that sufficiently good data will bring previously disparate observers to an agreement. It makes full use of available information, and it produces decisions having the least possible error rate."
- "Bayesian statistics is about making probability statements, frequentist statistics is about evaluating probability statements."
- "Statisticians are often put in a setting reminiscent of Arrow’s paradox, where we are asked to provide estimates that are informative and unbiased and confidence statements that are correct conditional on the data and also on the underlying true parameter." (These are conflicting requirements.)
- "Formal inferential aspects are often a relatively small part of statistical analysis"
- "The two philosophies, Bayesian and frequent, are more orthogonal than antithetical."
- "A hypothesis that may be true is rejected because it has failed to predict observable results that have not occurred. This seems a remarkable procedure."

=== Summary ===
- Bayesian theory has a mathematical advantage.
  - Frequentist probability has existence and consistency problems.
  - But finding good priors to apply Bayesian theory remains (very?) difficult.
- Both theories have impressive records of successful application.
- Neither the philosophical interpretation of probability nor its support is robust.
- There is increasing scepticism about the connection between application and philosophy.
- Some statisticians are recommending active collaboration (beyond a cease-fire).

== The likelihood principle ==
Likelihood is a synonym for probability in common usage. In statistics that is not true. A probability refers to variable data for a fixed hypothesis while a likelihood refers to variable hypotheses for a fixed set of data. Repeated measurements of a fixed length with a ruler generate a set of observations. Each fixed set of observational conditions is associated with a probability distribution and each set of observations can be interpreted as a sample from that distribution – the frequentist view of probability. Alternatively, a set of observations may result from sampling any of several distributions (each resulting from a set of observational conditions). The probabilistic relationship between a fixed sample and a variable distribution (resulting from a variable hypothesis) is termed likelihood – a Bayesian view of probability. A set of length measurements may imply readings taken by careful, sober, rested, motivated observers in good lighting.

A likelihood is a probability (or not) by another name that exists because of the limited frequentist definition of probability. The likelihood is a concept introduced and advanced by Fisher for more than 40 years (although prior references to the concept exist and Fisher's support was half-hearted). The concept was accepted and substantially changed by Jeffreys. In 1962 Birnbaum "proved" the likelihood principle from premises acceptable to most statisticians. His "proof" has been disputed by statisticians and philosophers. Importantly, by 1970 Birnbaum had rejected one of these premises (the conditionality principle) and had also rejected the likelihood principle because they were both incompatible with the frequentist "confidence concept of statistical evidence". The likelihood principle says that all of the information in a sample is contained in the likelihood function, which is accepted as a valid probability distribution by Bayesians (but not by frequentists).

Some (frequentist) significance tests are not consistent with the likelihood principle. Bayesians accept the principle which is consistent with their philosophy (perhaps encouraged by the discomfiture of frequentists). "[T]he likelihood approach is compatible with Bayesian statistical inference in the sense that the posterior Bayes distribution for a parameter is, by Bayes's Theorem, found by multiplying the prior distribution by the likelihood function." Frequentists interpret the principle adversely to Bayesian as implying no concern about the reliability of evidence. "The likelihood principle of Bayesian statistics implies that information about the experimental design from which evidence is collected does not enter into the statistical analysis of the data." Many Bayesians (Savage for example) recognize that implication as a vulnerability.

The likelihood principle's staunchest supporters claim that it offers a better foundation for statistics than either of the two schools. "[L]ikelihood looks very good indeed when it is compared with these [Bayesian and frequentist] alternatives." These supporters include statisticians and philosophers of science. While Bayesians acknowledge the importance of likelihood for calculation, they believe that the posterior probability distribution is the proper basis for inference.

== Modelling ==
Inferential statistics is based on statistical models. Much of classical hypothesis testing, for example, was based on the assumed normality of the data. Robust and nonparametric statistics were developed to reduce the dependence on that assumption. Bayesian statistics interprets new observations from the perspective of prior knowledge – assuming a modeled continuity between past and present. The design of experiments assumes some knowledge of those factors to be controlled, varied, randomized, and observed. Statisticians are well aware of the difficulties in proving causation (more of a modeling limitation than a mathematical one), saying "correlation does not imply causation".

More complex statistics utilize more complex models, often with the intent of finding a latent structure underlying a set of variables. As models and data sets have grown in complexity, (Note: Some large models attempt to predict the behavior of voters in the United States of America. The population is around 300 million. Each voter may be influenced by many factors. For some of the complications of voter behavior (most easily understood by the natives) see: Gelman) (Note: Efron (2013) mentions millions of data points and thousands of parameters from scientific studies.) foundational questions have been raised about the justification of the models and the validity of inferences drawn from them. The range of conflicting opinions expressed about modeling is large.

- Models can be based on scientific theory or ad-hoc data analysis. The approaches use different methods. There are advocates for each.
- Model complexity is a compromise. The Akaikean information criterion and Bayesian information criterion are two less subjective approaches to achieving that compromise.
- Fundamental reservations have been expressed about even simple regression models used in the social sciences. A long list of assumptions inherent to the validity of a model is typically neither mentioned nor checked. A favorable comparison between observations and model is often considered sufficient.
- Bayesian statistics focuses so tightly on the posterior probability that it ignores the fundamental comparison of observations and model.
- Traditional observation-based models are inadequate to solve many important problems. A much wider range of models, including algorithmic models, must be utilized. "If the model is a poor emulation of nature, the conclusions may be wrong."
- Modeling is often poorly done (the wrong methods are used) and poorly reported.

In the absence of a strong philosophical consensus review of statistical modeling, many statisticians accept the cautionary words of statistician George Box: "All models are wrong, but some are useful."

== Other reading ==
For a short introduction to the foundations of statistics, see Stuart, A.; Ord, J.K. (1994). "Ch. 8 – Probability and statistical inference". Kendall's Advanced Theory of Statistics. Vol. I: Distribution Theory (6th ed.). Edward Arnold.

In his book Statistics as Principled Argument, Robert P. Abelson articulates the position that statistics serve as a standardized means of settling disputes between scientists who could otherwise each argue the merits of their positions ad infinitum. From this point of view, statistics is a form of rhetoric; as with any means of settling disputes, statistical methods can succeed only as long as all parties agree on the approach used.

== See also ==
- Philosophy of statistics
- History of statistics
- Philosophy of probability
- Philosophy of mathematics
- Philosophy of science
- Evidence
- Likelihoodist statistics
- Probability interpretations
- Founders of statistics
