= Conditionality (disambiguation) =

Conditionality may refer to:

- Conditionality, in political economy and international relations
- Conditionality (Buddhism), also known as Pratitya-samutpada
- Conditionality principle in statistical inference
- Instrumental conditionality of objects in philosophy and ethics
