= Pseudolikelihood =

In statistical theory, a pseudolikelihood is an approximation to the joint probability distribution of a collection of random variables. The practical use of this is that it can provide an approximation to the likelihood function of a set of observed data which may either provide a computationally simpler problem for estimation, or may provide a way of obtaining explicit estimates of model parameters.

The pseudolikelihood approach was introduced by Julian Besag in the context of analysing data having spatial dependence.

== Definition ==
Given a set of random variables $X = X_1, X_2, \ldots, X_n$ the pseudolikelihood of $X = x = (x_1,x_2, \ldots, x_n)$ is

$$L(\theta) := \prod_i \mathrm{Pr}_\theta(X_i = x_i\mid X_j = x_j \text{ for } j \neq i)=\prod_i \mathrm {Pr}_\theta (X_i = x_i \mid X_{-i}=x_{-i})$$

in discrete case and

$$L(\theta) := \prod_i p_\theta(x_i \mid x_j \text{ for } j \neq i)=\prod_i p _\theta (x_i \mid x_{-i})=\prod _i p_\theta (x_i \mid x_1,\ldots, \hat x_i, \ldots, x_n)$$

in continuous one. Here $X$ is a vector of variables, $x$ is a vector of values, $p_\theta(\cdot \mid \cdot)$ is conditional density and $\theta =(\theta_1, \ldots, \theta_p)$ is the vector of parameters we are to estimate. The expression $X = x$ above means that each variable $X_i$ in the vector $X$ has a corresponding value $x_i$ in the vector $x$ and $x_{-i}=(x_1, \ldots,\hat x_i, \ldots, x_n)$ means that the coordinate $x_i$ has been omitted. The expression $\mathrm {Pr}_\theta(X = x)$ is the probability that the vector of variables $X$ has values equal to the vector $x$. This probability of course depends on the unknown parameter $\theta$. Because situations can often be described using state variables ranging over a set of possible values, the expression $\mathrm {Pr}_\theta(X = x)$ can therefore represent the probability of a certain state among all possible states allowed by the state variables.

The pseudo-log-likelihood is a similar measure derived from the above expression, namely (in discrete case)

$$l(\theta):=\log L(\theta) = \sum_i \log \mathrm{Pr}_\theta(X_i = x_i\mid X_j = x_j \text{ for } j \neq i).$$

One use of the pseudolikelihood measure is as an approximation for inference about a Markov or Bayesian network, as the pseudolikelihood of an assignment to $X_i$ may often be computed more efficiently than the likelihood, particularly when the latter may require marginalization over a large number of variables.

== Properties ==
Use of the pseudolikelihood in place of the true likelihood function in a maximum likelihood analysis can lead to good estimates, but a straightforward application of the usual likelihood techniques to derive information about estimation uncertainty, or for significance testing, would in general be incorrect.
