= Statistical theory =

Theory of statistics

The theory of statistics provides a basis for the whole range of techniques, in both study design and data analysis, that are used within applications of statistics. The theory covers approaches to statistical-decision problems and to statistical inference, and the actions and deductions that satisfy the basic principles stated for these different approaches. Within a given approach, statistical theory gives ways of comparing statistical procedures; it can find the best possible procedure within a given context for given statistical problems, or can provide guidance on the choice between alternative procedures.

Apart from philosophical considerations about how to make statistical inferences and decisions, much of statistical theory consists of mathematical statistics, and is closely linked to probability theory, to utility theory, and to optimization.

== Scope ==
Statistical theory provides an underlying rationale and provides a consistent basis for the choice of methodology used in applied statistics.

=== Modelling ===
Statistical models describe the sources of data and can have different types of formulation corresponding to these sources and to the problem being studied. Such problems can be of various kinds:

- Sampling from a finite population
- Measuring observational error and refining procedures
- Studying statistical relations

Statistical models, once specified, can be tested to see whether they provide useful inferences for new data sets.

=== Data collection ===
Statistical theory provides a guide to comparing methods of data collection, where the problem is to generate informative data using optimization and randomization while measuring and controlling for observational error. Optimization of data collection reduces the cost of data while satisfying statistical goals, while randomization allows reliable inferences. Statistical theory provides a basis for good data collection and the structuring of investigations in the topics of:

- Design of experiments to estimate treatment effects, to test hypotheses, and to optimize responses.
- Survey sampling to describe populations

=== Summarising data ===
The task of summarising statistical data in conventional forms (also known as descriptive statistics) is considered in theoretical statistics as a problem of defining what aspects of statistical samples need to be described and how well they can be described from a typically limited sample of data. Thus the problems theoretical statistics considers include:

- Choosing summary statistics to describe a sample
- Summarising probability distributions of sample data while making limited assumptions about the form of distribution that may be met
- Summarising the relationships between different quantities measured on the same items with a sample

=== Interpreting data ===
Besides the philosophy underlying statistical inference, statistical theory has the task of considering the types of questions that data analysts might want to ask about the problems they are studying and of providing data analytic techniques for answering them. Some of these tasks are:

- Summarising populations in the form of a fitted distribution or probability density function
- Summarising the relationship between variables using some type of regression analysis
- Providing ways of predicting the outcome of a random quantity given other related variables
- Examining the possibility of reducing the number of variables being considered within a problem (the task of Dimension reduction)

When a statistical procedure has been specified in the study protocol, then statistical theory provides well-defined probability statements for the method when applied to all populations that could have arisen from the randomization used to generate the data. This provides an objective way of estimating parameters, estimating confidence intervals, testing hypotheses, and selecting the best. Even for observational data, statistical theory provides a way of calculating a value that can be used to interpret a sample of data from a population, it can provide a means of indicating how well that value is determined by the sample, and thus a means of saying corresponding values derived for different populations are as different as they might seem; however, the reliability of inferences from post-hoc observational data is often worse than for planned randomized generation of data.

=== Applied statistical inference ===
Statistical theory provides the basis for a number of data-analytic approaches that are common across scientific and social research. Interpreting data is done with one of the following approaches:

- Estimating parameters
- Providing a range of values instead of a point estimate
- Testing statistical hypotheses

Many of the standard methods for those approaches rely on certain statistical assumptions (made in the derivation of the methodology) actually holding in practice. Statistical theory studies the consequences of departures from these assumptions. In addition it provides a range of robust statistical techniques that are less dependent on assumptions, and it provides methods checking whether particular assumptions are reasonable for a given data set.

== See also ==
- List of statistical topics
- Foundations of statistics
