= Allan Birnbaum =

American statistician

Allan Birnbaum (May 27, 1923 – July 1, 1976) was an American statistician who contributed to statistical inference, foundations of statistics, statistical genetics, statistical psychology, and history of statistics.

== Life and career ==
Birnbaum was born in San Francisco. His parents were Russian-born Orthodox Jews. He studied mathematics at the University of California, Berkeley, doing a premedical programme at the same time. After taking a bachelor's degree in mathematics in 1945, he spent two years doing graduate courses in science, mathematics and philosophy, planning perhaps a career in the philosophy of science. One of his philosophy teachers, Hans Reichenbach, suggested he combine philosophy with science.

He went to Columbia University to do a PhD with Abraham Wald but, when Wald died in a plane crash, Birnbaum asked Erich Leo Lehmann, who was visiting Columbia to take him on. Birnbaum's thesis and his early work was very much in the spirit of Lehmann's classic text Testing Statistical Hypotheses.

Birnbaum stayed at Columbia until 1959 when he moved to the Courant Institute of Mathematical Sciences, becoming a full Professor of Statistics in 1963. He travelled a good deal and liked Britain especially. In 1975 he accepted a post at the City University, London, and worked with The Open University on their course M341 "Fundamentals of statistical inference" (with Adrian Smith). He took his life in 1976.

The article in the Leading Personalities volume opens with the declaration, "Allan Birnbaum was one of the most profound thinkers in the field of foundations of statistics." The assessment is based on Birnbaum's 1962 article and the publications surrounding it. Birnbaum's theorem which argued for the likelihood principle generated great controversy; it implied, amongst other things, a repudiation of the approach of Wald and Lehmann, that Birnbaum had followed in his own research. Leonard Jimmie Savage opened the discussion by saying

Without any intent to speak with exaggeration or rhetorically, it seems to me that this is really a historic occasion. This paper is landmark in statistics because it seems to me improbable that many people will be able to read this paper or to have heard it tonight without coming away with considerable respect for the likelihood principle.

Although Birnbaum made other contributions, none compared with this for impact or continuing resonance.

== Publications of Allan Birnbaum ==
41 papers are listed by Barnard and Godambe. The first appeared in 1953 and the last, posthumously, in 1977. The most celebrated is the 1962 paper on the likelihood principle.

- Birnbaum, Allan (1962). "On the foundations of statistical inference". Journal of the American Statistical Association. 57 (298). American Statistical Association: 269–326. doi:10.2307/2281640. JSTOR 2281640. (With discussion.)

== Discussions ==
- Norton, B. (1977). "Obituary of Allan D. Birnbaum". Journal of the Royal Statistical Society, Series A. 140: 564–565. ISSN 0035-9238.
- Barnard, G.A.; Godambe, V.P. (1982). "Memorial article: Allan Birnbaum 1923–1976". Annals of Statistics. 10 (4): 1033–1039. doi:10.1214/aos/1176345968.
- Johnson, N.L.; Kotz, S., eds. (1997). "Allan Birnbaum". Leading Personalities in Statistical Sciences from the Seventeenth Century to the Present. New York: Wiley. pp. 83–85. ISBN 0-471-16381-3. – originally published in Encyclopedia of Statistical Science.

== See also ==
- CLs method (particle physics)#Allan Birnbaum
