= Deborah Mayo =

American philosopher

Deborah G. Mayo FBA is an American philosopher of science and author. She is a professor emerita in the Department of Philosophy at Virginia Tech and holds a visiting appointment at the Center for the Philosophy of Natural and Social Science of the London School of Economics.

== Biography ==
Mayo graduated from Clark University with a bachelor's degree in mathematics in 1974. She received her PhD in philosophy from the University of Pennsylvania in 1979, thesis title "Philosophy of Statistics".

Mayo was a professor of philosophy at Virginia Tech from 1979 to 2016. She taught undergraduate and graduate courses, including introductory and advanced logic (meta-theory of logic and modal logic), the scientific method and philosophy of science. She also held academic positions and taught classes in the Department of Economics at Virginia Tech, and the Center for the Study of Science and Society.

Her most recent research focuses on developing an account of experimental inference in science based upon statistical reasoning and the idea of learning from error.

== Awards ==
In 1998, Mayo received the Lakatos Award for her book Error and the Growth of Experimental Knowledge. The prize is awarded every year to recently published English contributions on the philosophy of science which is considered an outstanding work in the field.

In 1997, Mayo received the Sturm Award for Excellence in Faculty Research, awarded by Phi Beta Kappa.

In July 2022, Mayo was inducted as a Corresponding Fellow of the British Academy.

== Published books ==
- Acceptable Evidence: Science and Values in Risk Management, co-edited with R.D. Hollander, Oxford University Press, 1994
- Error and the Growth of Experimental Knowledge, University of Chicago Press, 1996.
- Error and Inference: Recent Exchanges on Experimental Reasoning, Reliability, and the Objectivity and Rationality of Science, Cambridge University Press, 2010
- Statistical Inference as Severe Testing: How to Get Beyond the Statistics Wars, Cambridge University Press, 2018 ISBN 978-1107664647

== See also ==
- List of female philosophers
- List of women in statistics
