= Likelihood principle =

Proposition in statistics

In statistics, the likelihood principle is the proposition that, given a statistical model, all the evidence in a sample relevant to model parameters is contained in the likelihood function. This principle is controversial because it is inconsistent with the mainstream frequentist approach to inference. While the likelihood function is important to frequentists, they do not accept the likelihood principle.

A likelihood function arises from a probability density function considered as a function of its distributional parameterization argument. For example, consider a model which gives the probability density function $\; f_X(x \mid \theta)\;$ of observable random variable $\, X \,$ as a function of a parameter $\,\theta~$. Then for a specific value $\,x\,$ of $\,X~$, the function $\,\mathcal{L}(\theta \mid x) = f_X(x \mid \theta)\;$ is a likelihood function of $\,\theta~$: it gives a measure of how "likely" any particular value of $\,\theta\,$ is, if we know that $\,X\,$ has the value $\,x~$. The density function may be a density with respect to counting measure, i.e. a probability mass function.

Two likelihood functions are equivalent if one is a scalar multiple of the other. (Note: Geometrically, if they occupy the same point in projective space.) The likelihood principle is this: All information from the data that is relevant to inferences about the value of the model parameters is in the equivalence class to which the likelihood function belongs. The strong likelihood principle applies this same criterion to cases such as sequential experiments where the sample of data that is available results from applying a stopping rule to the observations earlier in the experiment.

== Example ==
Suppose

- $\ X\$ is the number of successes in twelve independent Bernoulli trials with each attempt having probability $\ \theta\$ of success on each trial, and
- $\ Y\$ is the number of independent Bernoulli trials needed to get a total of three successes, again each attempt with probability $\ \theta\$ of success on each trial (if it was a fair coin each toss would have $\ \theta = \tfrac{\!\ 1\!\ }{ 2 }\$ of either outcome, heads or tails).

Then the observation that $\ X = 3\$ induces the likelihood function

$$\ \operatorname{\mathcal L}\left(\ \theta\ \mid\ X = 3\ \right) = \binom{12}{3} ~ \theta^3\ (1 - \theta)^9 = 220\ \theta^3\ (1-\theta)^9\ ,$$

while the observation that $\ Y = 12\$ induces the likelihood function

$$\ \operatorname{\mathcal L}\left(\ \theta\ \mid\ Y = 12\ \right) = \binom{11}{2} ~ \theta^3\ (1 - \theta)^9 = 55\ \theta^3\ (1 - \theta)^9 ~.$$

The likelihood principle says that, as the data are the same in both cases, the inferences drawn about the value of $\ \theta\$ should also be the same. In addition, all the inferential content in the data about the value of $\ \theta\$ is contained in the two likelihoods, and is the same if they are proportional to one another. This is the case in the above example, reflecting the fact that the difference between observing $\ X = 3\$ and observing $\ Y = 12\$ lies not in the actual data collected, nor in the conduct of the experimenter, but in the two different designs of the experiment.

Specifically, in one case, the decision in advance was to try twelve times, regardless of the outcome; in the other case, the advance decision was to keep trying until three successes were observed. If you support the likelihood principle then inference about $\ \theta\$ should be the same for both cases because the two likelihoods are proportional to each other: Except for a constant leading factor of 220 vs. 55, the two likelihood functions are the same – constant multiples of each other.

In contrast, the use of frequentist methods involving p values leads to different inferences for the two cases above, showing that the outcome of frequentist methods depends on the experimental procedure, and thus violates the likelihood principle. From the frequentist viewpoint, such examples highlight the inappropriateness of the likelihood principle.

== The law of likelihood ==
A related concept is the law of likelihood, the notion that the extent to which the evidence supports one parameter value or hypothesis against another is indicated by the ratio of their likelihoods, their likelihood ratio. That is,

$$\Lambda = {\mathcal L(a\mid X=x) \over \mathcal L(b\mid X=x)} = {P(X=x\mid a) \over P(X=x\mid b)}$$

is the degree to which the observation x supports parameter value or hypothesis a against b. If this ratio is 1, the evidence is indifferent; if greater than 1, the evidence supports the value a against b; or if less, then vice versa.

In Bayesian statistics, this ratio is known as the Bayes factor, and Bayes' rule can be seen as the application of the law of likelihood to inference.

In frequentist inference, the likelihood ratio is used in the likelihood-ratio test, but other non-likelihood tests are used as well. The Neyman–Pearson lemma states the likelihood-ratio test is equally statistically powerful as the most powerful test for comparing two simple hypotheses at a given significance level, which gives a frequentist justification for the law of likelihood.

Combining the likelihood principle with the law of likelihood yields the consequence that the parameter value which maximizes the likelihood function is the value which is most strongly supported by the evidence. This is one basis for the widely used method of maximum likelihood.

== History ==
The likelihood principle was first identified by that name in print in 1962 (Barnard et al., Birnbaum, and Savage et al.), but arguments for the same principle, unnamed, and the use of the principle in applications goes back to the works of R.A. Fisher in the 1920s. The likelihood principle has not been adopted by the frequentist approach to inference. The law of likelihood was identified by that name by I. Hacking (1965). More recently the likelihood principle as a general principle of inference has been championed by A.W.F. Edwards. The likelihood principle has been applied to the philosophy of science by R. Royall.

Birnbaum (1962) initially argued that the likelihood principle follows from two more primitive and seemingly reasonable principles, the conditionality principle and the sufficiency principle:

- The conditionality principle says that if an experiment is chosen by a random process independent of the states of nature $\ \theta\ ,$ then only the experiment actually performed is relevant to inferences about $\ \theta ~.$
- The sufficiency principle says that if $\ T(X)\$ is a sufficient statistic for $\ \theta\ ,$ and if in two experiments with data $\ x_1\$ and $\ x_2\$ we have $\ T(x_1) = T(x_2)\ ,$ then the evidence about $\ \theta\$ given by the two experiments is the same.

However, upon further consideration Birnbaum rejected both his conditionality principle and the likelihood principle. The adequacy of Birnbaum's original argument has also been contested by others (see below for details).

== Arguments for and against ==
Some widely used methods of conventional statistics, for example many significance tests, are not consistent with the likelihood principle.

Let us briefly consider some of the arguments for and against the likelihood principle.

=== The original Birnbaum argument ===
According to Giere (1977), Birnbaum rejected both his own conditionality principle and the likelihood principle because they were both incompatible with what he called the “confidence concept of statistical evidence”, which Birnbaum (1970) describes as taking “from the Neyman-Pearson approach techniques for systematically appraising and bounding the probabilities (under respective hypotheses) of seriously misleading interpretations of data” ( p. 1033). The confidence concept incorporates only limited aspects of the likelihood concept and only some applications of the conditionality concept. Birnbaum later notes that it was the unqualified equivalence formulation of his 1962 version of the conditionality principle that led “to the monster of the likelihood axiom” ( p. 263).

Birnbaum's original argument for the likelihood principle has also been disputed by other statisticians including Akaike, Evans and philosophers of science, including Deborah Mayo. Dawid points out fundamental differences between Mayo's and Birnbaum's definitions of the conditionality principle, arguing Birnbaum's argument cannot be so readily dismissed. A new proof of the likelihood principle has been provided by Gandenberger that addresses some of the counterarguments to the original proof.

=== Experimental design arguments on the likelihood principle ===
Unrealized events play a role in some common statistical methods. For example, the result of a significance test depends on the p-value, the probability of a result as extreme or more extreme than the observation, and that probability may depend on the design of the experiment. To the extent that the likelihood principle is accepted, such methods are therefore denied.

Classical significance tests are not based on the likelihood principle. The following are a simple and more complicated example of those, using a commonly cited example called the optional stopping problem.

Example 1 – simple version

Suppose I tell you that I tossed a coin 12 times and in the process observed 3 heads. You might make some inference about the probability of heads and whether the coin was fair.

Suppose now I tell that I tossed the coin until I observed 3 heads, and I tossed it 12 times. Will you now make some different inference?

The likelihood function in both cases is proportional to: $p^3 (1-p)^9 ~$.

So according to the likelihood principle, in either case the inference should be the same.

Example 2 – a more elaborated version of the same statistics

Suppose a number of scientists are assessing the probability of a certain outcome (which we shall call 'success') in experimental trials. Conventional wisdom suggests that if there is no bias towards success or failure then the success probability would be one half. Adam, a scientist, conducted 12 trials and obtains 3 successes and 9 failures. One of those successes was the 12th and last observation. Then Adam left the lab.

Bill, a colleague in the same lab, continued Adam's work and published Adam's results, along with a significance test. He tested the null hypothesis that p, the success probability, is equal to a half, versus p < 0.5 . If we ignore the information that the third success was the 12th and last observation, the probability of the observed result that out of 12 trials 3 or something fewer (i.e. more extreme) were successes, if H_{0} is true, is

$$\left[{12 \choose 3}+{12 \choose 2}+{12 \choose 1}+{12 \choose 0}\right]\left({1 \over 2}\right)^{12} ~$$,

which is 299/4096 = 7.3% . Thus the null hypothesis is not rejected at the 5% significance level if we ignore the knowledge that the third success was the 12th result.

However observe that this first calculation also includes 12 token long sequences that end in tails contrary to the problem statement!

If we redo this calculation we realize the likelihood according to the null hypothesis must be the probability of a fair coin landing 2 or fewer heads on 11 trials multiplied with the probability of the fair coin landing a head for the 12th trial:

$$\left[{11 \choose 2}+{11 \choose 1}+{11 \choose 0}\right]\left({1 \over 2}\right)^{11}{1 \over 2} ~$$,

which is 67/2048 1/2 = 67/4096 = 1.64% . Now the result is statistically significant at the 5% level. This probability does not include the chance of finding a value more extreme than the one we observed, which is atypical; however, it poses an interesting comparison with the next example.

Charlotte, another scientist, reads Bill's paper and writes a letter, saying that it is possible that Adam kept trying until he obtained 3 successes, in which case the probability of needing to conduct 12 or more experiments is given by

$$\left[{11 \choose 2}+{11 \choose 1}+{11 \choose 0}\right]\left({1 \over 2}\right)^{11}$$,

which is 67/2048 = 3.27% . Now the result is also statistically significant at the 5% level.

Note that the latter two analyses result in likelihood functions which are proportional up to a multiplicative constant of 1/2. According to the likelihood principle, the inference in either case should be the same. If the significance level was 2% instead of 5%, however, they would result in different conclusions. Therefore, to these scientists, the significance of their result depends on the design of the experiment, as it determines the specific value of the likelihood function at some parameter value (i.e. p = 0.5), which will be compared to the significance threshold.

Summary of the illustrated issues

Results of this kind are considered by some as arguments against the likelihood principle. For others it exemplifies the value of the likelihood principle and is an argument against significance tests.

Similar themes appear when comparing Fisher's exact test with Pearson's chi-squared test.

=== The voltmeter story ===
An argument in favor of the likelihood principle is given by Edwards in his book Likelihood. He cites the following story from J.W. Pratt, slightly condensed here. Note that the likelihood function depends only on what actually happened, and not on what could have happened.

An engineer draws a random sample of electron tubes and measures their voltages. The measurements range from 75 to 99 Volts. A statistician computes the sample mean and a confidence interval for the true mean. Later the statistician discovers that the voltmeter reads only as far as 100 Volts, so technically, the population appears to be “censored”. If the statistician is orthodox this necessitates a new analysis.

However, the engineer says he has another meter reading to 1000 Volts, which he would have used if any voltage had been over 100. This is a relief to the statistician, because it means the population was effectively uncensored after all. But later, the statistician discovers that the second meter had not been working when the measurements were taken. The engineer informs the statistician that he would not have held up the original measurements until the second meter was fixed, and the statistician informs him that new measurements are required. The engineer is astounded. “Next you'll be asking about my oscilloscope!”

Throwback to Example 2 in the prior section

This story can be translated to Adam's stopping rule above, as follows: Adam stopped immediately after 3 successes, because his boss Bill had instructed him to do so. After the publication of the statistical analysis by Bill, Adam realizes that he has missed a later instruction from Bill to instead conduct 12 trials, and that Bill's paper is based on this second instruction. Adam is very glad that he got his 3 successes after exactly 12 trials, and explains to his friend Charlotte that by coincidence he executed the second instruction. Later, Adam is astonished to hear about Charlotte's letter, explaining that now the result is significant.

== See also ==
- Conditionality principle
- Likelihoodist statistics

== Sources ==
- Barnard, G.A.; Jenkins, G.M.; Winsten, C.B. (1962). "Likelihood inference and time series". Journal of the Royal Statistical Society. Series A. 125 (3): 321–372. doi:10.2307/2982406. ISSN 0035-9238. JSTOR 2982406.
- Berger, J.O.; Wolpert, R.L. (1988). The Likelihood Principle (2nd ed.). Haywood, CA: The Institute of Mathematical Statistics. ISBN 0-940600-13-7.
- Birnbaum, A. (1962). "On the foundations of statistical inference (with discussion)". Journal of the American Statistical Association. 57 (298): 269–326. doi:10.2307/2281640. ISSN 0162-1459. JSTOR 2281640. MR 0138176.
- Edwards, A.W.F. (1972). Likelihood (1st ed.). Cambridge, UK: Cambridge University Press. ISBN 9780521082990.
- Edwards, A.W.F. (1992). Likelihood (2nd ed.). Baltimore, MD: Johns Hopkins University Press. ISBN 0-8018-4445-2.
- Edwards, A.W.F. (1974). "The history of likelihood". International Statistical Review. 42 (1): 9–15. doi:10.2307/1402681. ISSN 0306-7734. JSTOR 1402681. MR 0353514.
- Fisher, R.A. (1922). "On the mathematical foundations of theoretical statistics" (PDF). Philosophical Transactions of the Royal Society A. 222 (594–604): 326. Bibcode:1922RSPTA.222..309F. doi:10.1098/rsta.1922.0009. hdl:2440/15172.
- Hacking, I. (1965). Logic of Statistical Inference. Cambridge, GB: Cambridge University Press. ISBN 0-521-05165-7.
- Jeffreys, H. (1961). The Theory of Probability. The Oxford University Press.
- Mayo, D.G. (2010). "An error in the argument from conditionality and sufficiency to the likelihood principle" (PDF). In Mayo, D.; Spanos, A. (eds.). Error and Inference: Recent exchanges on experimental reasoning, reliability and the objectivity and rationality of science. Cambridge, UK: Cambridge University Press. pp. 305–314. ISBN 9780521180252.
- Royall, Richard M. (1997). Statistical Evidence: A likelihood paradigm. London, UK: Chapman & Hall. ISBN 0-412-04411-0 – via Internet Archive (archive.org).
- Savage, L.J.; et al. (1962). The Foundations of Statistical Inference. London, UK: Methuen.
