= Conditionality principle =

There have been a number of conditionality principles proposed in statistics, beginning with Fisher (always condition on an ancillary statistic when one exists). The most well-known conditionality principle is the principle of statistical inference that Allan Birnbaum formally defined and studied in an article in the Journal of the American Statistical Association, Birnbaum (1962).

Informally, his conditionality principle can be taken as the claim that

Experiments which were not actually performed are not relevant to any statistical analysis

and the implicit admonition that unrealized experiments should be ignored: Not included as part of any calculation or discussion of results.

Together with the sufficiency principle, Birnbaum's version of the principle implies the famous likelihood principle. However, by 1970 Birnbaum had rejected both his own conditionality principle and the likelihood principle because they were both incompatible with what he called the “confidence concept of statistical evidence”.

== Formulation ==
The conditionality principle makes an assertion about a composite experiment, $\ E\ ,$ that can be described as a suite or assemblage of several constituent experiments $\ E_h\ ;$ the index $\ h\$ is some ancillary statistic, i.e. a statistic whose probability distribution does not depend on any unknown parameter values. This means that obtaining an observation of some specific outcome $\ x\$ of the whole experiment $\ E\$ requires first observing a value for $\ h\ ,$ and then taking an observation $\ x_h\$ from the indicated component experiment $\ E_h ~.$

The conditionality principle can be formally stated thus:

Birnbaum's Conditionality Principle:
If $\ E\$ is any experiment having the form of a mixture of component experiments $\ E_h\ ,$ then for each outcome $\ \bigl(\ E_h, x_h\ \bigr)\$ of $\ E\ ,$ the evidential meaning of any outcome $\ x\$ of any mixture experiment $\ E\$ is the same as that of the corresponding outcome $\ x_h\$ of the corresponding component experiment $\ E_h\$ actually conducted, ignoring the overall structure of the mixed experiment; see Birnbaum (1962).

=== Examples ===
An illustration of the conditionality principle, in a bioinformatics context, is given by Barker (2014).

Example scenario

The ancillary statistic $\ h\$ could be the roll of die, whose value will be one of $\ h = 1, \ldots\ ,\ 6 ~.$ This random selection of an experiment is actually a wise precaution to curb the influence of a researchers' biases, if there is reason to suspect that the researcher might consciously or unconsciously select an experiment that seems like it would be likely to produce data that supports a favored hypothesis. The result of the dice roll then determines which of six possible experiments $\ E_1, \ldots\ ,\ E_6\ ,$ is the one actually conducted to obtain the study's data.

Say that the die rolls a '3'. In that case, the result observed for $\ x\$ is actually $\ x_3\ ,$ the outcome of experminent $\ E_3 ~.$ None of the other five experiments $\ E_1, E_2, E_4, E_5, ~~ \mathsf{ or } ~~ E_6\$ is ever conducted, and none of the other possible results is ever seen, $\ x_1, x_2, x_4, x_5, ~~ \mathsf{or} ~~ x_6\ ,$ that might have been observed if some other number than '3' had come up. The actual observed outcome, $\ x_3\ ,$ is unaffected by any aspect of the other five sub-experiments that were not carried out, and only the procedures and experimental design of $\ E_3\ ,$ the sub-experiment that was conducted to collect the data, $\ x_3\ ,$ had any bearing on the statistical analysis the outcome, regardless of the fact that the experimental designs for the experiments which might have been conducted had been prepared at the time of the actual experiment $\ E_3\ ,$ and might just as likely been performed.

The conditionality principle says that all of the details of $\ E_1, E_2, E_4, E_5, ~~ \mathsf{ or } ~~ E_6\$ must be excluded from the statistical analysis of the actual observation $\ x_3\ ,$ and even the fact that experiment 3 was chosen by the roll of a die: Further, none of the possible randomness brought into the outcome by the statistic $\ h\$ (the dice roll) can be included in the analysis either. The only thing that determines the correct statistics to be used for the data analysis is experiment $\ E_3\ ,$ and the only data to consider is $\ x_3\ ,$ not $\ h = 3 ~.$
