= Statistical inference =

Process of using data analysis for predicting population data from sample data

Statistical inference is the process of using data analysis to infer properties of an underlying probability distribution. Inferential statistical analysis infers properties of a population, for example by testing hypotheses and deriving estimates. It is assumed that the observed data set is sampled from a larger population.

Inferential statistics can be contrasted with descriptive statistics. Descriptive statistics is solely concerned with properties of the observed data, and it does not rest on the assumption that the data come from a larger population. In machine learning, the term inference is sometimes used instead to mean "make a prediction, by evaluating an already trained model"; in this context inferring properties of the model is referred to as training or learning (rather than inference), and using a model for prediction is referred to as inference (instead of prediction); see also predictive inference.

== Introduction ==
Statistical inference makes propositions about a population, using data drawn from the population with some form of sampling. Given a hypothesis about a population, for which we wish to draw inferences, statistical inference consists of (first) selecting a statistical model of the process that generates the data and (second) deducing propositions from the model.

Konishi and Kitagawa state "The majority of the problems in statistical inference can be considered to be problems related to statistical modeling". Relatedly, Sir David Cox has said, "How [the] translation from subject-matter problem to statistical model is done is often the most critical part of an analysis".

The conclusion of a statistical inference is a statistical proposition. Some common forms of statistical proposition are the following:

- a point estimate, i.e. a particular value that best approximates some parameter of interest;
- an interval estimate, e.g. a confidence interval (or set estimate). A confidence interval is an interval constructed using data from a sample, such that if the procedure were repeated over many independent samples (mathematically, by taking the limit), a fixed proportion (e.g., 95% for a 95% confidence interval) of the resulting intervals would contain the true value of the parameter, i.e., the population parameter;
- a credible interval, i.e. a set of values containing, for example, 95% of posterior belief;
- rejection of a hypothesis; (Note: According to Peirce, acceptance means that inquiry on this question ceases for the time being. In science, all scientific theories are revisable.)
- clustering or classification of data points into groups.

== Models and assumptions ==
Any statistical inference requires some assumptions. A statistical model is a set of assumptions concerning the generation of the observed data and similar data. Descriptions of statistical models usually emphasize the role of population quantities of interest, about which we wish to draw inference. Descriptive statistics are typically used as a preliminary step before more formal inferences are drawn.

=== Degree of models/assumptions ===
Statisticians distinguish between three levels of modeling assumptions:

- Fully parametric: The probability distributions describing the data-generation process are assumed to be fully described by a family of probability distributions involving only a finite number of unknown parameters. For example, one may assume that the distribution of population values is truly Normal, with unknown mean and variance, and that datasets are generated by 'simple' random sampling. The family of generalized linear models is a widely used and flexible class of parametric models.
- Non-parametric: The assumptions made about the process generating the data are much less than in parametric statistics and may be minimal. For example, every continuous probability distribution has a median, which may be estimated using the sample median or the Hodges–Lehmann–Sen estimator, which has good properties when the data arise from simple random sampling.
- Semi-parametric: This term typically implies assumptions 'in between' fully and non-parametric approaches. For example, one may assume that a population distribution has a finite mean. Furthermore, one may assume that the mean response level in the population depends in a truly linear manner on some covariate (a parametric assumption) but not make any parametric assumption describing the variance around that mean (i.e. about the presence or possible form of any heteroscedasticity). More generally, semi-parametric models can often be separated into 'structural' and 'random variation' components. One component is treated parametrically and the other non-parametrically. The well-known Cox model is a set of semi-parametric assumptions.

=== Importance of valid models/assumptions ===
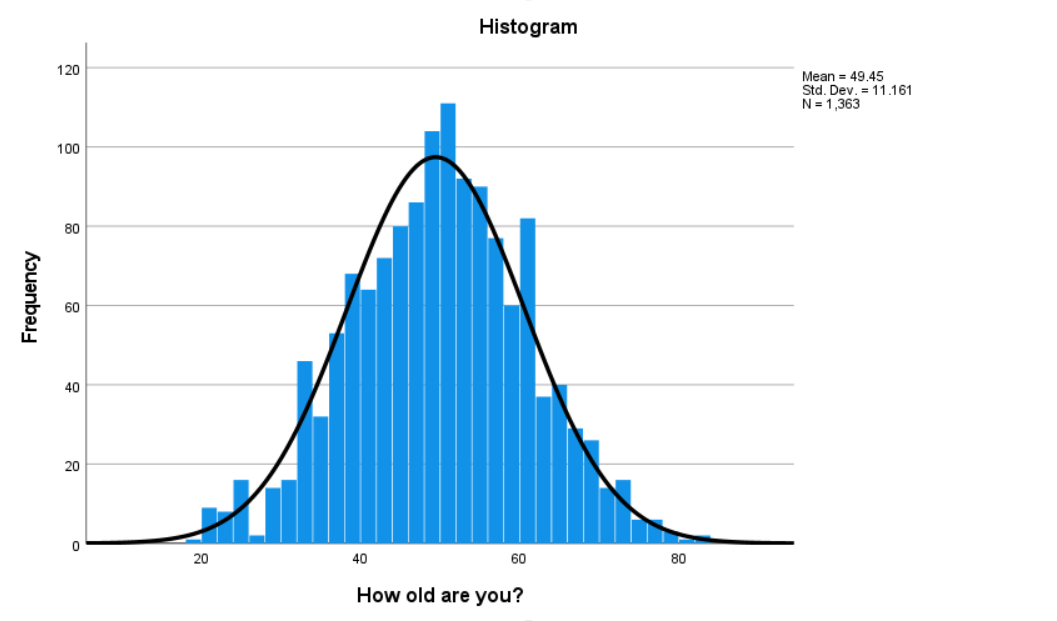
The above image shows a histogram assessing the assumption of normality, which can be illustrated through the even spread underneath the bell curve.

Whatever level of assumption is made, correctly calibrated inference, in general, requires these assumptions to be correct; i.e. that the data-generating mechanisms really have been correctly specified.

Incorrect assumptions of 'simple' random sampling can invalidate statistical inference. More complex semi- and fully parametric assumptions are also cause for concern. For example, incorrectly assuming the Cox model can in some cases lead to faulty conclusions. Incorrect assumptions of Normality in the population also invalidates some forms of regression-based inference. The use of any parametric model is viewed skeptically by most experts in sampling human populations: "most sampling statisticians, when they deal with confidence intervals at all, limit themselves to statements about [estimators] based on very large samples, where the central limit theorem ensures that these [estimators] will have distributions that are nearly normal." In particular, a normal distribution "would be a totally unrealistic and catastrophically unwise assumption to make if we were dealing with any kind of economic population." Here, the central limit theorem states that the distribution of the sample mean "for very large samples" is approximately normally distributed, if the distribution is not heavy-tailed.

==== Approximate distributions ====
Given the difficulty in specifying exact distributions of sample statistics, many methods have been developed for approximating these.

With finite samples, approximation results measure how close a limiting distribution approaches the statistic's sample distribution: For example, with 10,000 independent samples the normal distribution approximates (to two digits of accuracy) the distribution of the sample mean for many population distributions, by the Berry–Esseen theorem. Yet for many practical purposes, the normal approximation provides a good approximation to the sample-mean's distribution when there are 10 (or more) independent samples, according to simulation studies and statisticians' experience. Following Kolmogorov's work in the 1950s, advanced statistics uses approximation theory and functional analysis to quantify the error of approximation. In this approach, the metric geometry of probability distributions is studied; this approach quantifies approximation error with, for example, the Kullback–Leibler divergence, Bregman divergence, and the Hellinger distance.

With indefinitely large samples, limiting results like the central limit theorem describe the sample statistic's limiting distribution if one exists. Limiting results are not statements about finite samples, and indeed are irrelevant to finite samples. However, the asymptotic theory of limiting distributions is often invoked for work with finite samples. For example, limiting results are often invoked to justify the generalized method of moments and the use of generalized estimating equations, which are popular in econometrics and biostatistics. The magnitude of the difference between the limiting distribution and the true distribution (formally, the 'error' of the approximation) can be assessed using simulation. The heuristic application of limiting results to finite samples is common practice in many applications, especially with low-dimensional models with log-concave likelihoods (such as with one-parameter exponential families).

=== Randomization-based models ===
For a given dataset that was produced by a randomization design, the randomization distribution of a statistic (under the null-hypothesis) is defined by evaluating the test statistic for all of the plans that could have been generated by the randomization design. In frequentist inference, the randomization allows inferences to be based on the randomization distribution rather than a subjective model, and this is important especially in survey sampling and design of experiments. Statistical inference from randomized studies is also more straightforward than many other situations. In Bayesian inference, randomization is also of importance: in survey sampling, use of sampling without replacement ensures the exchangeability of the sample with the population; in randomized experiments, randomization warrants a missing at random assumption for covariate information.

Objective randomization allows properly inductive procedures. Many statisticians prefer randomization-based analysis of data that was generated by well-defined randomization procedures. (However, it is true that in fields of science with developed theoretical knowledge and experimental control, randomized experiments may increase the costs of experimentation without improving the quality of inferences.) Similarly, results from randomized experiments are recommended by leading statistical authorities as allowing inferences with greater reliability than do observational studies of the same phenomena. However, a good observational study may be better than a bad randomized experiment.

The statistical analysis of a randomized experiment may be based on the randomization scheme stated in the experimental protocol and does not need a subjective model.

However, at any time, some hypotheses cannot be tested using objective statistical models, which accurately describe randomized experiments or random samples. In some cases, such randomized studies are uneconomical or unethical.

==== Model-based analysis of randomized experiments ====
It is standard practice to refer to a statistical model, e.g., a linear or logistic models, when analyzing data from randomized experiments. However, the randomization scheme guides the choice of a statistical model. It is not possible to choose an appropriate model without knowing the randomization scheme. Seriously misleading results can be obtained analyzing data from randomized experiments while ignoring the experimental protocol; common mistakes include forgetting the blocking used in an experiment and confusing repeated measurements on the same experimental unit with independent replicates of the treatment applied to different experimental units.

==== Model-free randomization inference ====
Model-free techniques provide a complement to model-based methods, which employ reductionist strategies of reality-simplification. The former combine, evolve, ensemble and train algorithms dynamically adapting to the contextual affinities of a process and learning the intrinsic characteristics of the observations.

For example, model-free simple linear regression is based either on:

- a random design, where the pairs of observations $(X_1,Y_1), (X_2,Y_2), \cdots , (X_n,Y_n)$ are independent and identically distributed (iid),
- or a deterministic design, where the variables $X_1, X_2, \cdots, X_n$ are deterministic, but the corresponding response variables $Y_1,Y_2, \cdots, Y_n$ are random and independent with a common conditional distribution, i.e., $P\left (Y_j \leq y | X_j =x\right ) = D_x(y)$, which is independent of the index $j$.

In either case, the model-free randomization inference for features of the common conditional distribution $D_x(.)$ relies on some regularity conditions, e.g. functional smoothness. For instance, model-free randomization inference for the population feature conditional mean, $\mu(x)=E(Y | X = x)$, can be consistently estimated via local averaging or local polynomial fitting, under the assumption that $\mu(x)$ is smooth. Also, relying on asymptotic normality or resampling, we can construct confidence intervals for the population feature, in this case, the conditional mean, $\mu(x)$.

== Paradigms for inference ==
Different schools of statistical inference have become established. These schools—or "paradigms"—are not mutually exclusive, and methods that work well under one paradigm often have attractive interpretations under other paradigms.

Bandyopadhyay and Forster describe four paradigms: The classical (or frequentist) paradigm, the Bayesian paradigm, the likelihoodist paradigm, and the Akaikean-Information Criterion-based paradigm.

=== Frequentist inference ===
This paradigm calibrates the plausibility of propositions by considering (notional) repeated sampling of a population distribution to produce datasets similar to the one at hand. By considering the dataset's characteristics under repeated sampling, the frequentist properties of a statistical proposition can be quantified—although in practice this quantification may be challenging.

==== Examples of frequentist inference ====
- p-value
- Confidence interval
- Null hypothesis significance testing

==== Frequentist inference, objectivity, and decision theory ====
One interpretation of frequentist inference (or classical inference) is that it is applicable only in terms of frequency probability; that is, in terms of repeated sampling from a population. However, the approach of Neyman develops these procedures in terms of pre-experiment probabilities. That is, before undertaking an experiment, one decides on a rule for coming to a conclusion such that the probability of being correct is controlled in a suitable way: such a probability need not have a frequentist or repeated sampling interpretation. In contrast, Bayesian inference works in terms of conditional probabilities (i.e. probabilities conditional on the observed data), compared to the marginal (but conditioned on unknown parameters) probabilities used in the frequentist approach.

The frequentist procedures of significance testing and confidence intervals can be constructed without regard to utility functions. However, some elements of frequentist statistics, such as statistical decision theory, do incorporate utility functions. In particular, frequentist developments of optimal inference (such as minimum-variance unbiased estimators, or uniformly most powerful testing) make use of loss functions, which play the role of (negative) utility functions. Loss functions need not be explicitly stated for statistical theorists to prove that a statistical procedure has an optimality property. However, loss-functions are often useful for stating optimality properties: for example, median-unbiased estimators are optimal under absolute value loss functions, in that they minimize expected loss, and least squares estimators are optimal under squared error loss functions, in that they minimize expected loss.

While statisticians using frequentist inference must choose for themselves the parameters of interest, and the estimators/test statistic to be used, the absence of obviously explicit utilities and prior distributions has helped frequentist procedures to become widely viewed as 'objective'.

=== Bayesian inference ===
The Bayesian calculus describes degrees of belief using the 'language' of probability; beliefs are positive, integrate into one, and obey probability axioms. Bayesian inference uses the available posterior beliefs as the basis for making statistical propositions. There are several different justifications for using the Bayesian approach.

==== Examples of Bayesian inference ====
- Credible interval for interval estimation
- Bayes factors for model comparison

==== Bayesian inference, subjectivity and decision theory ====
Many informal Bayesian inferences are based on "intuitively reasonable" summaries of the posterior. For example, the posterior mean, median and mode, highest posterior density intervals, and Bayes Factors can all be motivated in this way. While a user's utility function need not be stated for this sort of inference, these summaries do all depend (to some extent) on stated prior beliefs, and are generally viewed as subjective conclusions. (Methods of prior construction which do not require external input have been proposed but not yet fully developed.)

Formally, Bayesian inference is calibrated with reference to an explicitly stated utility, or loss function; the 'Bayes rule' is the one which maximizes expected utility, averaged over the posterior uncertainty. Formal Bayesian inference therefore automatically provides optimal decisions in a decision theoretic sense. Given assumptions, data and utility, Bayesian inference can be made for essentially any problem, although not every statistical inference need have a Bayesian interpretation. Analyses which are not formally Bayesian can be (logically) incoherent; a feature of Bayesian procedures which use proper priors (i.e. those integrable to one) is that they are guaranteed to be coherent. Some advocates of Bayesian inference assert that inference must take place in this decision-theoretic framework, and that Bayesian inference should not conclude with the evaluation and summarization of posterior beliefs.

=== Likelihood-based inference ===
Likelihood-based inference is a paradigm used to estimate the parameters of a statistical model based on observed data. Likelihoodism approaches statistics by using the likelihood function, denoted as $L(x | \theta)$, quantifies the probability of observing the given data $x$, assuming a specific set of parameter values $\theta$. In likelihood-based inference, the goal is to find the set of parameter values that maximizes the likelihood function, or equivalently, maximizes the probability of observing the given data.

The process of likelihood-based inference usually involves the following steps:

1. Formulating the statistical model: A statistical model is defined based on the problem at hand, specifying the distributional assumptions and the relationship between the observed data and the unknown parameters. The model can be simple, such as a normal distribution with known variance, or complex, such as a hierarchical model with multiple levels of random effects.
2. Constructing the likelihood function: Given the statistical model, the likelihood function is constructed by evaluating the joint probability density or mass function of the observed data as a function of the unknown parameters. This function represents the probability of observing the data for different values of the parameters.
3. Maximizing the likelihood function: The next step is to find the set of parameter values that maximizes the likelihood function. This can be achieved using optimization techniques such as numerical optimization algorithms. The estimated parameter values, often denoted as $\bar{y}$, are the maximum likelihood estimates (MLEs).
4. Assessing uncertainty: Once the MLEs are obtained, it is crucial to quantify the uncertainty associated with the parameter estimates. This can be done by calculating standard errors, confidence intervals, or conducting hypothesis tests based on asymptotic theory or simulation techniques such as bootstrapping.
5. Model checking: After obtaining the parameter estimates and assessing their uncertainty, it is important to assess the adequacy of the statistical model. This involves checking the assumptions made in the model and evaluating the fit of the model to the data using goodness-of-fit tests, residual analysis, or graphical diagnostics.
6. Inference and interpretation: Finally, based on the estimated parameters and model assessment, statistical inference can be performed. This involves drawing conclusions about the population parameters, making predictions, or testing hypotheses based on the estimated model.

=== AIC-based inference ===
The Akaike information criterion (AIC) is an estimator of the relative quality of statistical models for a given set of data. Given a collection of models for the data, AIC estimates the quality of each model, relative to each of the other models. Thus, AIC provides a means for model selection.

AIC is founded on information theory: it offers an estimate of the relative information lost when a given model is used to represent the process that generated the data. (In doing so, it deals with the trade-off between the goodness of fit of the model and the simplicity of the model.)

=== Other paradigms for inference ===
==== Minimum description length ====
The minimum description length (MDL) principle has been developed from ideas in information theory and the theory of Kolmogorov complexity. The (MDL) principle selects statistical models that maximally compress the data; inference proceeds without assuming counterfactual or non-falsifiable "data-generating mechanisms" or probability models for the data, as might be done in frequentist or Bayesian approaches.

However, if a "data generating mechanism" does exist in reality, then according to Shannon's source coding theorem it provides the MDL description of the data, on average and asymptotically. In minimizing description length (or descriptive complexity), MDL estimation is similar to maximum likelihood estimation and maximum a posteriori estimation (using maximum-entropy Bayesian priors). However, MDL avoids assuming that the underlying probability model is known; the MDL principle can also be applied without assumptions that e.g. the data arose from independent sampling.

The MDL principle has been applied in communication-coding theory in information theory, in linear regression, and in data mining.

The evaluation of MDL-based inferential procedures often uses techniques or criteria from computational complexity theory.

==== Fiducial inference ====
Fiducial inference was an approach to statistical inference based on fiducial probability, also known as a "fiducial distribution". In subsequent work, this approach has been called ill-defined, extremely limited in applicability, and even fallacious. However this argument is the same as that which shows that a so-called confidence distribution is not a valid probability distribution and, since this has not invalidated the application of confidence intervals, it does not necessarily invalidate conclusions drawn from fiducial arguments. An attempt was made to reinterpret the early work of Fisher's fiducial argument as a special case of an inference theory using upper and lower probabilities.

==== Structural inference ====
Developing ideas of Fisher and of Pitman from 1938 to 1939, George A. Barnard developed "structural inference" or "pivotal inference", an approach using invariant probabilities on group families. Barnard reformulated the arguments behind fiducial inference on a restricted class of models on which "fiducial" procedures would be well-defined and useful. Donald A. S. Fraser developed a general theory for structural inference based on group theory and applied this to linear models. The theory formulated by Fraser has close links to decision theory and Bayesian statistics and can provide optimal frequentist decision rules if they exist.

==== Universal Inference (UI) ====
See Universal Inference

== Inference topics ==
The topics below are usually included in the area of statistical inference.

1. Statistical assumptions
2. Statistical decision theory
3. Estimation theory
4. Statistical hypothesis testing
5. Revising opinions in statistics
6. Design of experiments, the analysis of variance, and regression
7. Survey sampling
8. Summarizing statistical data

== Predictive inference ==
Predictive inference is an approach to statistical inference that emphasizes the prediction of future observations based on past observations.

Initially, predictive inference was based on observable parameters and it was the main purpose of studying probability, but it fell out of favor in the 20th century due to a new parametric approach pioneered by Bruno de Finetti. The approach modeled phenomena as a physical system observed with error (e.g., celestial mechanics). De Finetti's idea of exchangeability—that future observations should behave like past observations—came to the attention of the English-speaking world with the 1974 translation from French of his 1937 paper, and has since been propounded by such statisticians as Seymour Geisser.

== See also ==
- Algorithmic inference
- Induction (philosophy)
- Informal inferential reasoning
- Information field theory
- Population proportion
- Philosophy of statistics
- Prediction interval
- Predictive analytics
- Predictive modelling
- Stylometry
