= Deficiency =

A deficiency is generally a lack of something. It may also refer to:

- A deficient number, in mathematics, a number n for which σ(n) < 2n
- Angular deficiency, in geometry, the difference between a sum of angles and the corresponding sum in a Euclidean plane
- Deficiency (graph theory), a property describing how far a given graph is from having a perfect matching
- Deficiency (medicine), including various types of malnutrition, as well as genetic diseases caused by deficiencies of endogenously produced proteins
- A deficiency in construction, an item, or condition that is considered sub-standard, or below minimum expectations
- Genetic deletion, in genetics, also called a deficiency
- A deficiency judgment, in the law of real estate
- Deficiency (statistics) is a measure to compare two statistical models.
