= Local asymptotic normality =

In statistics, local asymptotic normality is a property of a sequence of statistical models, which allows this sequence to be asymptotically approximated by a normal location model, after an appropriate rescaling of the parameter. An important example when the local asymptotic normality holds is in the case of i.i.d sampling from a regular parametric model.

The notion of local asymptotic normality was introduced by Le Cam (1960) and is fundamental in the treatment of estimator and test efficiency.

== Definition ==
A sequence of parametric statistical models { P_{n,θ}: θ ∈ Θ } is said to be locally asymptotically normal (LAN) at θ if there exist matrices r_{n} and I_{θ} and a random vector Δ_{n,θ} ~ N(0, I_{θ}) such that, for every converging sequence h_{n} → h,

$$\ln \frac{dP_{\!n,\theta+r_n^{-1}h_n}}{dP_{n,\theta}} = h'\Delta_{n,\theta} - \frac12 h'I_\theta\,h + o_{P_{n,\theta}}(1),$$

where the derivative here is a Radon–Nikodym derivative, which is a formalised version of the likelihood ratio, and where o is a type of little O in probability notation. In other words, the local likelihood ratio must converge in distribution to a normal random variable whose mean is equal to minus one half the variance:

$$\ln \frac{dP_{\!n,\theta+r_n^{-1}h_n}}{dP_{n,\theta}}\ \ \xrightarrow{d}\ \ \mathcal{N}\Big( {-\tfrac12} h'I_\theta\,h,\ h'I_\theta\,h\Big).$$

The sequences of distributions $P_{\!n,\theta+r_n^{-1}h_n}$ and $P_{n,\theta}$ are contiguous.

=== Example ===
The most straightforward example of a LAN model is an iid model whose likelihood is twice continuously differentiable. Suppose { X_{1}, X_{2}, …, X_{n} } is an iid sample, where each X_{i} has density function f(x, θ). The likelihood function of the model is equal to

$$p_{n,\theta}(x_1,\ldots,x_n;\,\theta) = \prod_{i=1}^n f(x_i,\theta).$$

If f is twice continuously differentiable in θ, then

$$\begin{align}
\ln p_{n,\theta+\delta\theta}
&\approx \ln p_{n,\theta} + \delta\theta'\frac{\partial \ln p_{n,\theta}}{\partial\theta} + \frac12 \delta\theta' \frac{\partial^2 \ln p_{n,\theta}}{\partial\theta\,\partial\theta'} \delta\theta \\
&= \ln p_{n,\theta} + \delta\theta' \sum_{i=1}^n\frac{\partial \ln f(x_i,\theta)}{\partial\theta} + \frac12 \delta\theta' \bigg[\sum_{i=1}^n\frac{\partial^2 \ln f(x_i,\theta)}{\partial\theta\,\partial\theta'} \bigg]\delta\theta .
\end{align}$$

Plugging in $\delta\theta=h/\sqrt{n}$, gives

$$\ln \frac{p_{n,\theta+h/\sqrt{n}}}{p_{n,\theta}} =
h' \Bigg(\frac{1}{\sqrt{n}} \sum_{i=1}^n\frac{\partial \ln f(x_i,\theta)}{\partial\theta}\Bigg) \;-\;
\frac12 h' \Bigg( \frac1n \sum_{i=1}^n - \frac{\partial^2 \ln f(x_i,\theta)}{\partial\theta\,\partial\theta'} \Bigg) h \;+\;
o_p(1).$$

By the central limit theorem, the first term (in parentheses) converges in distribution to a normal random variable Δ_{θ} ~ N(0, I_{θ}), whereas by the law of large numbers the expression in second parentheses converges in probability to I_{θ}, which is the Fisher information matrix:

$$I_\theta = \mathrm{E}\bigg[{- \frac{\partial^2 \ln f(X_i,\theta)}{\partial\theta\,\partial\theta'}}\bigg] = \mathrm{E}\bigg[\bigg(\frac{\partial \ln f(X_i,\theta)}{\partial\theta}\bigg)\bigg(\frac{\partial \ln f(X_i,\theta)}{\partial\theta}\bigg)'\,\bigg].$$

Thus, the definition of the local asymptotic normality is satisfied, and we have confirmed that the parametric model with iid observations and twice continuously differentiable likelihood has the LAN property.

== See also ==
- Asymptotic distribution
