= Semiparametric regression =

Regression models that combine parametric and nonparametric models

In statistics, semiparametric regression includes regression models that combine parametric and nonparametric models. They are often used in situations where the fully nonparametric model may not perform well or when the researcher wants to use a parametric model but the functional form with respect to a subset of the regressors or the density of the errors is not known. Semiparametric regression models are a particular type of semiparametric modelling and, since semiparametric models contain a parametric component, they rely on parametric assumptions and may be misspecified and inconsistent, just like a fully parametric model.

== Methods ==
Many different semiparametric regression methods have been proposed and developed. The most popular methods are the partially linear, index and varying coefficient models.

=== Partially linear models ===
A partially linear model is given by

$$Y_i = X'_i \beta + g\left(Z_i \right) + u_i, \, \quad  i = 1,\ldots,n, \,$$

where $Y_{i}$ is the dependent variable, $X_{i}$ is a $p \times 1$ vector of explanatory variables, $\beta$ is a $p \times 1$ vector of unknown parameters and $Z_{i} \in \operatorname{R}^{q}$. The parametric part of the partially linear model is given by the parameter vector $\beta$ while the nonparametric part is the unknown function $g\left(Z_{i}\right)$. The data is assumed to be i.i.d. with $E\left(u_{i}|X_{i},Z_{i}\right) = 0$ and the model allows for a conditionally heteroskedastic error process $E\left(u^{2}_{i}|x,z\right) = \sigma^{2}\left(x,z\right)$ of unknown form. This type of model was proposed by Robinson (1988) and extended to handle categorical covariates by Racine and Li (2007).

This method is implemented by obtaining a $\sqrt{n}$ consistent estimator of $\beta$ and then deriving an estimator of $g\left(Z_{i}\right)$ from the nonparametric regression of $Y_{i} - X'_{i}\hat{\beta}$ on $z$ using an appropriate nonparametric regression method.

=== Index models ===
A single index model takes the form

$$Y = g\left(X'\beta_{0}\right) + u, \,$$

where $Y$, $X$ and $\beta_{0}$ are defined as earlier and the error term $u$ satisfies $E\left(u|X\right) = 0$. The single index model takes its name from the parametric part of the model $x'\beta$ which is a scalar single index. The nonparametric part is the unknown function $g\left(\cdot\right)$.

==== Ichimura's method ====
The single index model method developed by Ichimura (1993) is as follows. Consider the situation in which $y$ is continuous. Given a known form for the function $g\left(\cdot\right)$, $\beta_{0}$ could be estimated using the nonlinear least squares method to minimize the function

$$\sum_{i=1} \left(Y_i - g\left(X'_i \beta\right)\right)^2.$$

Since the functional form of $g\left(\cdot\right)$ is not known, we need to estimate it. For a given value for $\beta$ an estimate of the function

$$G\left(X'_i \beta \right) = E\left(Y_i |X'_i \beta\right) = E\left[g\left(X'_i\beta_o \right)|X'_i \beta\right]$$

using kernel method. Ichimura (1993) proposes estimating $g\left(X'_{i}\beta\right)$ with

$$\hat{G}_{-i}\left(X'_i \beta\right),\,$$

the leave-one-out nonparametric kernel estimator of $G\left(X'_{i}\beta\right)$.

==== Klein and Spady's estimator ====
If the dependent variable $y$ is binary and $X_{i}$ and $u_{i}$ are assumed to be independent, Klein and Spady (1993) propose a technique for estimating $\beta$ using maximum likelihood methods. The log-likelihood function is given by

$$L\left(\beta\right) = \sum_i \left(1-Y_i\right)\ln\left(1-\hat{g}_{-i}\left(X'_i\beta\right)\right) + \sum_{i}Y_i\ln\left(\hat{g}_{-i}\left(X'_i \beta\right)\right),$$

where $\hat{g}_{-i}\left(X'_{i}\beta\right)$ is the leave-one-out estimator.

=== Smooth coefficient/varying coefficient models ===
Hastie and Tibshirani (1993) propose a smooth coefficient model given by

$$Y_i = \alpha\left(Z_i\right) + X'_i\beta\left(Z_i\right) + u_i
= \left(1 + X'_i\right)\left(\begin{array}{c} \alpha\left(Z_i\right) \\ \beta\left(Z_i\right) \end{array}\right) + u_i
= W'_i\gamma\left(Z_i\right) + u_i,$$

where $X_{i}$ is a $k \times 1$ vector and $\beta\left(z\right)$ is a vector of unspecified smooth functions of $z$.

$\gamma\left(\cdot\right)$ may be expressed as

$$\gamma\left(Z_i\right) = \left(E\left[W_i W'_i|Z_i \right]\right)^{-1}E\left[W_i Y_i|Z_i\right].$$

== See also ==
- Nonparametric regression
- Effective degree of freedom
