= Lucien Le Cam =

French mathematician and statistician

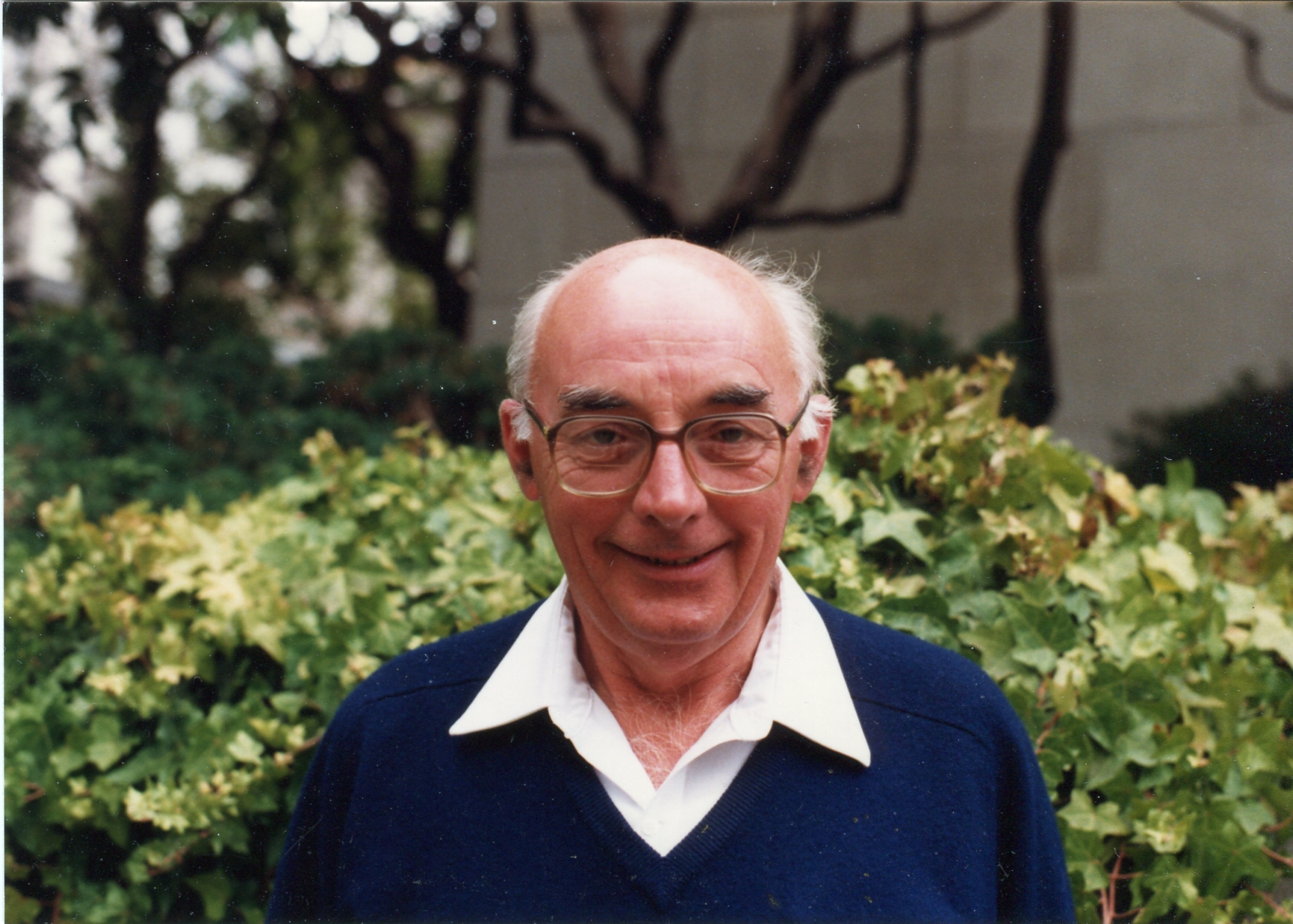
- Lucien Le Cam in 1987; Photo courtesy George M. Bergman
- Born: November 18, 1924; Croze, Creuse, France
- Died: April 25, 2000 (aged 75)
- Education: University of Paris; University of California, Berkeley
- Known for: Le Cam's theorem
- Scientific career
- Fields: Mathematics
- Workplaces: University of California, Berkeley
- Doctoral advisor: Jerzy Neyman
- Doctoral students: Julius R. Blum; Thomas S. Ferguson; Stephen Stigler; Jane-Ling Wang; Grace Yang; Bin Yu

Lucien Marie Le Cam (November 18, 1924 – April 25, 2000) was a mathematician and statistician.

== Biography ==
Le Cam was born November 18, 1924, in Croze, France. His parents were farmers, and unable to afford higher education for him; his father died when he was 13. After graduating from a Catholic school in 1942, he began studying at a seminary in Limoges, but immediately quit upon learning that he would not be allowed to study chemistry there. Instead he continued his studies at a lycée, which did not teach chemistry but did teach mathematics. In May 1944 he joined an underground group, and then went into hiding, returning to his school the following November but soon afterwards moving to Paris, where he began studying at the University of Paris. He graduated in 1945 with the degree licence ès sciences.

Le Cam then worked for a hydroelectric utility for five years, while meeting at the University of Paris for a weekly seminar in statistics. In 1950, he was invited to become an instructor at the University of California, Berkeley; he arrived that fall, with his original plan being to stay there a year on leave from his utility position. By the spring of 1951, he had met his future wife (Louise Romig, the daughter of statistician Harry Romig), decided to stay longer, and been admitted to the Ph.D. program. He obtained his Ph.D. in 1952, was appointed Assistant Professor in 1953 and continued working at Berkeley (except for a year in Montreal) beyond his retirement in 1991 until his death.

== Contributions ==
Le Cam was the major figure during the period 1950 – 1990 in the development of abstract general asymptotic theory in mathematical statistics. He is best known for the general concepts of local asymptotic normality and contiguity, and for developing a metric theory of statistical experiments, recounted in his 1986 magnum opus Asymptotic Methods in Statistical Decision Theory. Le Cam introduced the deficiency to compare two statistical models and the Le Cam distance bears his name.

== Selected publications ==
- Le Cam, Lucien (1986). Asymptotic Methods in Statistical Decision Theory. Springer-Verlag.
- Le Cam, Lucien; Yang, Grace Lo (2000). Asymptotics in statistics: some basic concepts. Springer. ISBN 0-387-95036-2.
- Le Cam, Lucien (1990). "Maximum likelihood — an introduction". ISI Review. 58 (2): 153–171. doi:10.2307/1403464. JSTOR 1403464.
