= Hadamard derivative =

In mathematics, the Hadamard derivative is a concept of directional derivative for maps between Banach spaces. It is particularly suited for applications in stochastic programming and asymptotic statistics.

== Definition ==
A map $\varphi : \mathbb{D}\to \mathbb{E}$ between Banach spaces $\mathbb{D}$ and $\mathbb{E}$ is Hadamard-directionally differentiable at $\theta \in \mathbb{D}$ in the direction $h \in \mathbb{D}$ if there exists a map $\varphi_\theta': \, \mathbb{D} \to \mathbb{E}$ such that
$$\frac{\varphi(\theta+t_n h_n)-\varphi(\theta)}{t_n} \to \varphi_\theta'(h)$$
for all sequences $h_n \to h$ and $t_n \to 0$.

Note that this definition does not require continuity or linearity of the derivative with respect to the direction $h$. Although continuity follows automatically from the definition, linearity does not.

== Relation to other derivatives ==
- If the Hadamard directional derivative exists, then the Gateaux derivative also exists and the two derivatives coincide.
- The Hadamard derivative is readily generalized for maps between Hausdorff topological vector spaces.

== Applications ==
A version of functional delta method holds for Hadamard directionally differentiable maps. Namely, let $X_n$ be a sequence of random elements in a Banach space $\mathbb{D}$ (equipped with Borel sigma-field) such that weak convergence $\tau_n (X_n-\mu) \to Z$ holds for some $\mu \in \mathbb{D}$, some sequence of real numbers $\tau_n\to \infty$ and some random element $Z \in \mathbb{D}$ with values concentrated on a separable subset of $\mathbb{D}$. Then for a measurable map $\varphi: \mathbb{D}\to\mathbb{E}$ that is Hadamard directionally differentiable at $\mu$ we have $\tau_n (\varphi(X_n)-\varphi(\mu)) \to \varphi_\mu'(Z)$ (where the weak convergence is with respect to Borel sigma-field on the Banach space $\mathbb{E}$).

This result has applications in optimal inference for wide range of econometric models, including models with partial identification and weak instruments.

== See also ==
- Directional derivative – Instantaneous rate of change of the function
- Fréchet derivative – Derivative defined on normed spaces - generalization of the total derivative
- Gateaux derivative – Generalization of the concept of directional derivative
- Generalizations of the derivative – Fundamental construction of differential calculus
- Total derivative – Type of derivative in mathematics
