= Asymptotic distribution =

Probability distribution to which random variables or distributions "converge"

In mathematics and statistics, an asymptotic distribution is a probability distribution that is in a sense the limiting distribution of a sequence of distributions. One of the main uses of the idea of an asymptotic distribution is in providing approximations to the cumulative distribution functions of statistical estimators.

== Definition ==
A sequence of distributions corresponds to a sequence of random variables Z_{i} for $i = 1, 2, \dots$. In the simplest case, an asymptotic distribution exists if the probability distribution of Z_{i} converges to a probability distribution (the asymptotic distribution) as i increases: see convergence in distribution. A special case of an asymptotic distribution is when the sequence $Z_i$ converges in distribution to zero. Here the asymptotic distribution is a degenerate distribution concentrated at zero.

However, the most usual sense in which the term asymptotic distribution is used arises where the random variables Z_{i} are modified by two sequences of non-random values. Thus if

$$Y_i=\frac{Z_i-a_i}{b_i}$$

converges in distribution to a non-degenerate distribution for two sequences {a_{i}} and {b_{i}} then Z_{i} is said to have that distribution as its asymptotic distribution. If the distribution function of the asymptotic distribution is F, then the following approximations hold for large n:

$$P\left(\frac{Z_n-a_n}{b_n} \le x \right) \approx F(x) ,$$
$$P(Z_n \le z) \approx F\left(\frac{z-a_n}{b_n}\right) .$$

If an asymptotic distribution exists, it is not necessarily true that any one outcome of the sequence of random variables is a convergent sequence of numbers. It is the sequence of probability distributions that converges.

== Central limit theorem ==
Perhaps the most common distribution to arise as an asymptotic distribution is the normal distribution. In particular, the central limit theorem provides an example where the asymptotic distribution is the normal distribution.

Central limit theorem
Suppose $\{X_1, X_2, \dots\}$ is a sequence of i.i.d. random variables with $\mathrm{E}[X_i] = \mu$ and $\operatorname{Var}[X_i] = \sigma^2 < \infty$. Let $S_n$ be the average of $\{X_1, \dots, X_n\}$. Then as $n$ approaches infinity, the random variables $\sqrt{n}(S_n - \mu)$ converge in distribution to a normal $N(0, \sigma^2)$:

The central limit theorem gives only an asymptotic distribution. As an approximation for a finite number of observations, it provides a reasonable approximation only when close to the peak of the normal distribution; it requires a very large number of observations to stretch into the tails.

=== Local asymptotic normality ===
Local asymptotic normality is a generalization of the central limit theorem. It is a property of a sequence of statistical models, which allows this sequence to be asymptotically approximated by a normal location model, after a rescaling of the parameter. An important example when the local asymptotic normality holds is in the case of independent and identically distributed sampling from a regular parametric model; this is just the central limit theorem.

Barndorff-Nielson & Cox provide a direct definition of asymptotic normality:

The sequence $\{V_n\}$ is asymptotically normal if there exist sequences of constants $\{a_n\}$, $\{b_n\}$ such that $(V_n-a_n)/b_n$ converges in distribution to the standard normal distribution. The constants $a_n$, $b_n$ are called respectively the asymptotic mean and standard deviation of $V_n$.

== See also ==
- Asymptotic analysis
- Asymptotic theory (statistics)
- de Moivre–Laplace theorem
- Limiting density of discrete points
- Delta method
