= Chain of events =

Sequence of related actions and effects

A chain of events is a number of actions and their effects that are contiguous and linked together that results in a particular outcome. In the physical sciences, chain reactions are a primary example.

== Determinism ==
Determinism is the philosophical proposition that every event, including human cognition and behaviour, decision and action, is causally determined by an unbroken chain of events. With numerous historical debates, many philosophical positions on the subject of determinism exist from traditions throughout the world.

== In value theory ==
In value theory, it is the amount of cause and effects of the chain of events before generating intrinsic value that separates high and low grades of instrumental value. The chain of events duration is the time it takes to reach the terminal event. In value theory this is generally the intrinsic value (also called terminal value). It is contrasted with ethic value duration, which is the time that an object has any value intensity.

== In accident analysis ==
In accident analysis (for example, in the analysis of aviation accidents), a chain of events (or error chain) consists of the contributing factors leading to an undesired outcome.

== See also ==
- Chain reaction
- Domino effect
