= Croze =

Commune in Nouvelle-Aquitaine, France

- Commune
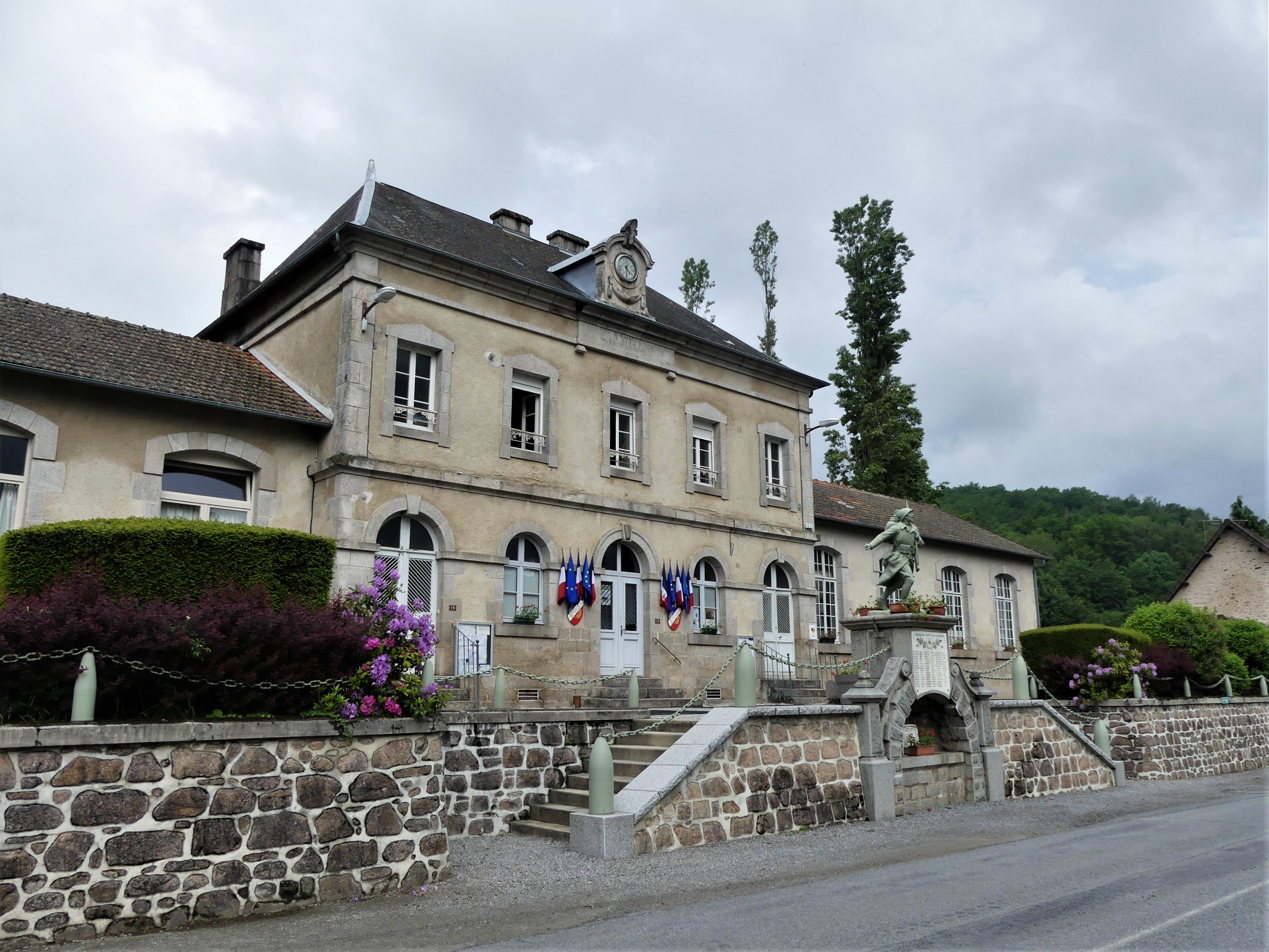
- Town hall

- Coat of arms
- Location of Croze
- Location within France Location within Nouvelle-Aquitaine
- Coordinates: 45°49′11″N 2°09′42″E
- Country: France
- Region: Nouvelle-Aquitaine
- Department: Creuse
- Arrondissement: Aubusson
- Canton: Felletin
- Intercommunality: CC Creuse Grand Sud

Government
  - Mayor (2020–2026): Didier Ternat
- Area^{1}: 22.16 km^{2} (8.56 sq mi)
- Highest elevation: 841 m (2,759 ft)
- Lowest elevation: 518 m (1,699 ft)
- Population (2023): 185
  - Density: 8.35/km^{2} (21.6/sq mi)
- Time zone: UTC+01:00 (CET)
  - Summer (DST): UTC+02:00 (CEST)
- INSEE/Postal code: 23071 /23500
- ^{1} French Land Register data, which excludes lakes, ponds, glaciers > 1 km^{2} (0.386 sq mi or 247 acres) and river estuaries.

Croze (French: [kʁɔz]) is a commune in the Creuse department in the Nouvelle-Aquitaine region in central France.

== Geography ==
Croze is an area of forestry and farming, comprising the village and a couple of hamlets, located at the confluence of the Creuse with the Gioune, some 10 miles (16 km) south of Aubusson at the junction of the D35 and the D982 roads.

== Population ==
Historical population
Year	Pop.	±% p.a.
1968	245	—
1975	196	−3.14%
1982	211	+1.06%
1990	202	−0.54%
1999	211	+0.49%
2007	187	−1.50%
2012	205	+1.86%
2017	196	−0.89%
2023	185	−0.96%
Source: INSEE

== Notable sites ==
- A twelfth-century church of St. John at Montel-Guillaume.
- The fifteenth-century chapel of St. Antoine.
- The nineteenth-century château de Mas-Laurent, which replaced an earlier building.

== Personalities ==
- Lucien Le Cam, mathematician, was born here.

== See also ==
- Communes of the Creuse department
