= Testimator =

A testimator is an estimator whose value depends on the result of a test for statistical significance. In the simplest case the value of the final estimator is that of the basic estimator if the test result is significant, and otherwise the value is zero. However more general testimators are possible.

== History ==
An early use of the term "testimator" way made by Brewster & Zidek (1974).
