= SackSEER =

SackSEER is a statistical model for predicting the performance of collegiate American football players who are trying to play in the National Football League. SackSEER was developed in 2010 by Nate Forster of Football Outsiders.

SackSEER only applies to defensive ends who are "edge rushers". The first version of SackSEER was published in the 2010 Football Outsiders Almanac.

== Methodology ==
According to the SackSEER chapter in the 2010 Football Outsiders Almanac, the formula considers four factors:

- vertical leap
- short shuttle time
- SRAM (an adjusted measure of per-game sack productivity in college)
- The total number of eligible games missed for any reason other than early entry into the NFL draft
