= Jane-Ling Wang =

Chinese-American statistician

- 王建玲
- Born: Taiwan
- Education: National Taiwan University (BS); University of California, Santa Barbara (MA); University of California, Berkeley (PhD)
- Scientific career
- Fields: Statistics
- Workplaces: University of Iowa; University of California, Davis; University of Pennsylvania; Academia Sinica
- Thesis: Asymptotically Minimax Estimators for Distributions with Increasing Failure Rate (1982)

Jane-Ling Wang (Chinese: 王建玲) is a Taiwanese-American statistician who is a distinguished professor of statistics at the University of California, Davis. She is a specialist in dimension reduction, functional data analysis, and aging.

== Education and career ==
Wang graduated from National Taiwan University in 1975 with a Bachelor of Science (B.S.) degree in mathematics. She then earned a Master of Arts (M.A.) in mathematics in 1978 from the University of California, Santa Barbara, and earned her Ph.D. in statistics in 1982 from the University of California, Berkeley. Her doctoral dissertation, supervised by Lucien Le Cam, was titled, "Asymptotically Minimax Estimators for Distributions with Increasing Failure Rate".

After starting her faculty career at the University of Iowa, she moved to Davis in 1984. She chaired the statistics department at Davis from 1999 to 2003.

== Awards and honors ==
Wang is a fellow of the American Statistical Association and of the Institute of Mathematical Statistics. She won the Outstanding Service Award of the International Chinese Statistical Association in 2010. She is the 2016 winner of the Gottfried E. Noether Senior Scholar Award of the American Statistical Association. In 2022 she was elected to the Academia Sinica.
