= Contiguity =

Contiguity or contiguous may refer to:

- Contiguous data storage, in computer science
- Contiguity (probability theory)
- Contiguity (psychology)
- Contiguous distribution of species, in biogeography
- Geographic contiguity of territorial land
- Contiguous zone in territorial waters
