= Contiguity (probability theory) =

In probability theory, two sequences of probability measures are said to be contiguous if asymptotically they share the same support. Thus the notion of contiguity extends the concept of absolute continuity to the sequences of measures.

The concept was originally introduced by Le Cam (1960) as part of his foundational contribution to the development of asymptotic theory in mathematical statistics. He is best known for the general concepts of local asymptotic normality and contiguity.

== Definition ==
Let $(\Omega_n,\mathcal{F}_n)$ be a sequence of measurable spaces, each equipped with two measures P_{n} and Q_{n}.

- We say that Q_{n} is contiguous with respect to P_{n} (denoted Q_{n} ◁ P_{n}) if for every sequence A_{n} of measurable sets, P_{n}(A_{n}) → 0 implies Q_{n}(A_{n}) → 0.
- The sequences P_{n} and Q_{n} are said to be mutually contiguous or bi-contiguous (denoted Q_{n} ◁▷ P_{n}) if both Q_{n} is contiguous with respect to P_{n} and P_{n} is contiguous with respect to Q_{n}.

The notion of contiguity is closely related to that of absolute continuity. We say that a measure Q is absolutely continuous with respect to P (denoted Q ≪ P) if for any measurable set A, P(A) = 0 implies Q(A) = 0. That is, Q is absolutely continuous with respect to P if the support of Q is a subset of the support of P, except in cases where this is false, including, e.g., a measure that concentrates on an open set, because its support is a closed set and it assigns measure zero to the boundary, and so another measure may concentrate on the boundary and thus have support contained within the support of the first measure, but they will be mutually singular. In summary, this previous sentence's statement of absolute continuity is false. The contiguity property replaces this requirement with an asymptotic one: Q_{n} is contiguous with respect to P_{n} if the "limiting support" of Q_{n} is a subset of the limiting support of P_{n}. By the aforementioned logic, this statement is also false.

It is possible however that each of the measures Q_{n} be absolutely continuous with respect to P_{n}, while the sequence Q_{n} not being contiguous with respect to P_{n}.

The fundamental Radon–Nikodym theorem for absolutely continuous measures states that if Q is absolutely continuous with respect to P, then Q has density with respect to P, denoted as ƒ = dQ/dP, such that for any measurable set A

$$Q(A) = \int_A f\,\mathrm{d}P, \,$$

which is interpreted as being able to "reconstruct" the measure Q from knowing the measure P and the derivative ƒ. A similar result exists for contiguous sequences of measures, and is given by the Le Cam's third lemma.

== Properties ==
- For the case $(P_n,Q_n)= (P,Q)$ for all n it applies $Q_n\triangleleft P_n\Leftrightarrow Q\ll P$.
- It is possible that $P_n\ll Q_n$ is true for all n without $P_n\triangleleft Q_n$.

== Le Cam's first lemma ==
For two sequences of measures $(P_n)\text{ and }(Q_n)$ on measurable spaces $(\Omega_n,\mathcal{F}_n)$ the following statements are equivalent:

- $P_n\triangleleft Q_n$
- $\frac{\mathrm dQ_n}{\mathrm dP_n}\overset{P_n}{\,\longrightarrow\,}U\text{ along a subsequence }\Rightarrow P(U>0)=1$
- $\frac{\mathrm dP_n}{\mathrm dQ_n}\overset{Q_n}{\,\longrightarrow\,}V\text{ along a subsequence }\Rightarrow E(V)=1$
- $T_n\overset{P_n}{\,\longrightarrow\,}0\,\Rightarrow\, T_n\overset{Q_n}{\,\longrightarrow\,}0$ for any statistics $T_n:\Omega_n\rightarrow\mathbb{R}$.

where $U$ and $V$ are random variables on $(\Omega,\mathcal{F},P)$ and $(\Omega',\mathcal{F}',Q)$.

=== Interpretation ===
Prohorov's theorem tells us that given a sequence of probability measures, every subsequence has a further subsequence which converges weakly. Le Cam's first lemma shows that the properties of the associated limit points determine whether contiguity applies or not. This can be understood in analogy with the non-asymptotic notion of absolute continuity of measures.

== Applications ==
- Econometrics

== See also ==
- Asymptotic theory (statistics)
- Contiguity (disambiguation)
- Probability space

== Additional literature ==
- Roussas, George G. (1972), Contiguity of Probability Measures: Some Applications in Statistics, CUP, ISBN 978-0-521-09095-7.
- Scott, D.J. (1982) Contiguity of Probability Measures, Australian & New Zealand Journal of Statistics, 24 (1), 80–88.
