= Grace Yang =

Chinese statistician

Grace Lo Yang (simplified Chinese: 罗昭容; traditional Chinese: 羅昭容; pinyin: Luó Zhāoróng) is a Taiwanese statistician whose research areas include stochastic processes in the physical sciences, asymptotic theory, and survival analysis. She is a professor of statistics in the department of mathematics at the University of Maryland, College Park. She was president of the International Chinese Statistical Association for 1990–1991 and program director for statistics at the National Science Foundation from 2005 to 2008.

== Education and career ==
Yang is originally from China, but moved to Taiwan in 1949. After doing her undergraduate studies at National Taiwan University, she completed her doctorate in 1966 from the University of California, Berkeley, under the supervision of Lucien Le Cam. Her dissertation was on Contagion in Stochastic Models for Epidemics. With Le Cam, she is the author of Asymptotics in Statistics: Some Basic Concepts (Springer, 1990; 2nd ed., 2002).

== Awards and honors ==
Yang is a member of the International Statistical Institute, and a fellow of the Institute of Mathematical Statistics.
