= Estimand =

Quantity in a statistical analysis

An estimand is a quantity that is to be estimated in a statistical analysis. The term is used to distinguish the target of inference from the method used to obtain an approximation of this target (i.e., the estimator) and the specific value obtained from a given method and dataset (i.e., the estimate). For instance, a normally distributed random variable $X$ has two defining parameters, its mean $\mu$ and variance $\sigma^{2}$. A variance estimator:

$s^{2} = \sum_{i=1}^{n} \left. \left( x_{i} - \bar{x} \right)^{2} \right/ (n-1)$,

yields an estimate of 7 for a data set $x = \left\{ 2, 3, 7 \right\}$; then $s^{2}$ is called an estimator of $\sigma^{2}$, and $\sigma^{2}$ is called the estimand.

== Definition ==
In relation to an estimator, an estimand is the outcome of different treatments of interest. It can formally be thought of as any quantity that is to be estimated in any type of experiment.

== Overview ==
An estimand is closely linked to the purpose or objective of an analysis. It describes what is to be estimated based on the question of interest. This is in contrast to an estimator, which defines the specific rule according to which the estimand is to be estimated. While the estimand will often be free of the specific assumptions e.g. regarding missing data, such assumption will typically have to be made when defining the specific estimator. For this reason, it is logical to conduct sensitivity analyses using different estimators for the same estimand, in order to test the robustness of inference to different assumptions.

According to recent research, quantitative studies frequently fail to define their estimand. This is problematic because it is not possible for the reader to know whether the statistical procedures in a study are appropriate unless they know the estimand.

== Examples ==
If our question of interest is whether instituting an intervention such as a vaccination campaign in a defined population in a country would reduce the number of deaths in that population in that country, then our estimand will be some measure of risk reduction (e.g. it could be a hazard ratio, or a risk ratio over one year) that would describe the effect of starting a vaccination campaign. We may have data from a clinical trial available to estimate the estimand. In judging the effect on the population level, we will have to reflect that some people may refuse to be vaccinated so that excluding from the analysis those in the clinical trial who refuse to be vaccinated may be inappropriate. Furthermore, we may not know the survival status of all those who were vaccinated, so that assumptions will have to be made in this regard in order to define an estimator.

One possible estimator for obtaining a specific estimate might be a hazard ratio based on a survival analysis that assumes a particular survival distribution conducted on all subjects to whom the intervention was offered, treating those who were lost to follow-up to be right-censored under random censorship. It might be that the trial population differs from the population, on which the vaccination campaign would be conducted, in which case this might also have to be taken into account. An alternative estimator used in a sensitivity analysis might assume that people, who were not followed for their vital status to the end of the trial, may be more likely to have died by a certain amount.

=== Epidemiological ===
In establishing clinical trials, often practitioners want to focus on measuring the effects of their treatments on a population of individuals. These aforementioned clinical settings are built with ideal scenarios, far removed from any intercurrent events. However, as this will often not be the case in reality, variability needs to be taken into account during the planning and execution of these trials. By building foundational objectives around the idea of the estimand framework in clinical medicine, it allows practitioners "to align the clinical study objective with the study design, endpoint, and analysis to improve study planning and the interpretation of analysis." The estimand provides a way to explicitly state how these intercurrent events will be dealt with in achieving the objective of the treatment in question.

== ICH ==
On October 22, 2014, the International Council for Harmonisation of Technical Requirements for Pharmaceuticals for Human Use (ICH) produced a final concept paper titled Choosing Appropriate Estimands and Defining Sensitivity Analyses in Clinical Trials as an addendum to their E9 guidance. On 16 October 2017 ICH announced that it had published the draft addendum on defining appropriate estimands for a clinical trial/sensitivity analyses for consultation. The final addendum to the ICH E9 guidance was released on November 20, 2019. According to the addendum, there are five core attributes that comparise an estimand: (i) population; (ii) treatment conditions; (iii) endpoint; (iv) summary measure; (v) the strategies used to handle each type of intercurrent event in the treatment effect definition. Kahan et al. provided tutorials on the ICH E9(R1) estimands framework.

By providing a structured framework for translating the objectives of a clinical trial to a matching trial design, conduct and analysis ICH aims to improve discussions between pharmaceutical companies and regulators authorities on drug development programs. The ultimate goal is to make sure that clinical trials provide clearly defined information on the effects of the studied medicines.
