= Parametric model =

Type of statistical model

In statistics, a parametric model or parametric family or finite-dimensional model is a particular class of statistical models. Specifically, a parametric model is a family of probability distributions that has a finite number of parameters.

== Definition ==
A statistical model is a collection of probability distributions on some sample space. We assume that the collection, $\mathcal{P}$, is indexed by some set Θ. The set Θ is called the parameter set or, more commonly, the parameter space. For each θ ∈ Θ, let F_{θ} denote the corresponding member of the collection; so F_{θ} is a cumulative distribution function. Then a statistical model can be written as

$$\mathcal{P} = \big\{ F_\theta\ \big|\ \theta\in\Theta \big\}.$$

The model is a parametric model if Θ ⊆ ℝ^{k} for some positive integer k.

When the model consists of absolutely continuous distributions, it is often specified in terms of corresponding probability density functions.

$$\mathcal{P} = \big\{ f_\theta\ \big|\ \theta\in\Theta \big\}.$$

== Examples ==
- The Poisson family of distributions is parametrized by a single number λ > 0:

$$\mathcal{P} = \Big\{\ p_\lambda(j) = \tfrac{\lambda^j}{j!}e^{-\lambda},\ j=0,1,2,3,\dots \ \Big|\;\; \lambda>0 \ \Big\},$$

where p_{λ} is the probability mass function. This family is an exponential family.

- The normal family is parametrized by θ = (μ, σ), where μ ∈ ℝ is a location parameter and σ > 0 is a scale parameter:

$$\mathcal{P} = \Big\{\ f_\theta(x) = \tfrac{1}{\sqrt{2\pi}\sigma} \exp\left(-\tfrac{(x-\mu)^2}{2\sigma^2}\right)\ \Big|\;\; \mu\in\mathbb{R}, \sigma>0 \ \Big\}.$$

This parametrized family is both an exponential family and a location-scale family.

- The Weibull translation model has a three-dimensional parameter θ = (λ, β, μ):

$$\mathcal{P} = \Big\{\
f_\theta(x) = \tfrac{\beta}{\lambda}
\left(\tfrac{x-\mu}{\lambda}\right)^{\beta-1}\!
\exp\!\big(\!-\!\big(\tfrac{x-\mu}{\lambda}\big)^\beta \big)\,
\mathbf{1}_{\{x>\mu\}}
\ \Big|\;\;
\lambda>0,\, \beta>0,\, \mu\in\mathbb{R}
\ \Big\},$$

where $\beta$ is the shape parameter, $\lambda$ is the scale parameter and $\mu$ is the location parameter.

- The binomial model is parametrized by θ = (n, p), where n is a non-negative integer and p is a probability (i.e. p ≥ 0 and p ≤ 1):

$$\mathcal{P} = \Big\{\ p_\theta(k) = \tfrac{n!}{k!(n-k)!}\, p^k (1-p)^{n-k},\ k=0,1,2,\dots, n \ \Big|\;\; n\in\mathbb{Z}_{\ge 0},\, p \ge 0 \land p \le 1\Big\}.$$

This example illustrates the definition for a model with some discrete parameters.

== General remarks ==
A parametric model is called identifiable if the mapping θ ↦ P_{θ} is invertible, i.e. there are no two different parameter values θ_{1} and θ_{2} such that P_{θ_{1}} = P_{θ_{2}}.

== Comparisons with other classes of models ==
Parametric models are contrasted with the semi-parametric, semi-nonparametric, and non-parametric models, all of which consist of an infinite set of "parameters" for description. The distinction between these four classes is as follows:

- in a "parametric" model all the parameters are in finite-dimensional parameter spaces;
- a model is "non-parametric" if all the parameters are in infinite-dimensional parameter spaces;
- a "semi-parametric" model contains finite-dimensional parameters of interest and infinite-dimensional nuisance parameters;
- a "semi-nonparametric" model has both finite-dimensional and infinite-dimensional unknown parameters of interest.

Some statisticians believe that the concepts "parametric", "non-parametric", and "semi-parametric" are ambiguous. It can also be noted that the set of all probability measures has a cardinality of the continuum, and therefore it is possible to parametrize any model at all by a single number in the (0,1) interval. This difficulty can be avoided by considering only "smooth" parametric models.

== See also ==
- Parametric family
- Parametric statistics
- Statistical model
- Statistical model specification

== Bibliography ==
- Bickel, Peter J.; Doksum, Kjell A. (2001), Mathematical Statistics: Basic and selected topics, vol. 1 (Second (updated printing 2007) ed.), Prentice-Hall
- Bickel, Peter J.; Klaassen, Chris A. J.; Ritov, Ya’acov; Wellner, Jon A. (1998), Efficient and Adaptive Estimation for Semiparametric Models, Springer
- Davison, A. C. (2003), Statistical Models, Cambridge University Press
- Le Cam, Lucien; Yang, Grace Lo (2000), Asymptotics in Statistics: Some basic concepts (2nd ed.), Springer
- Lehmann, Erich L.; Casella, George (1998), Theory of Point Estimation (2nd ed.), Springer
- Liese, Friedrich; Miescke, Klaus-J. (2008), Statistical Decision Theory: Estimation, testing, and selection, Springer
- Pfanzagl, Johann; with the assistance of R. Hamböker (1994), Parametric Statistical Theory, Walter de Gruyter, MR 1291393
