= Semiparametric model =

Type of statistical model

In statistics, a semiparametric model is a statistical model that has parametric and nonparametric components.

A statistical model is a parameterized family of distributions: $\{P_\theta: \theta \in \Theta\}$ indexed by a parameter $\theta$.

- A parametric model is a model in which the indexing parameter $\theta$ is a vector in $k$-dimensional Euclidean space, for some nonnegative integer $k$. Thus, $\theta$ is finite-dimensional, and $\Theta \subseteq \mathbb{R}^k$.
- With a nonparametric model, the set of possible values of the parameter $\theta$ is a subset of some space $V$, which is not necessarily finite-dimensional. For example, we might consider the set of all distributions with mean 0. Such spaces are vector spaces with topological structure, but may not be finite-dimensional as vector spaces. Thus, $\Theta \subseteq V$ for some possibly infinite-dimensional space $V$.
- With a semiparametric model, the parameter has both a finite-dimensional component and an infinite-dimensional component (often a real-valued function defined on the real line). Thus, $\Theta \subseteq \mathbb{R}^k \times V$, where $V$ is an infinite-dimensional space.

It may appear at first that semiparametric models include nonparametric models, since they have an infinite-dimensional as well as a finite-dimensional component. However, a semiparametric model is considered to be "smaller" than a completely nonparametric model because we are often interested only in the finite-dimensional component of $\theta$. That is, the infinite-dimensional component is regarded as a nuisance parameter. In nonparametric models, by contrast, the primary interest is in estimating the infinite-dimensional parameter. Thus the estimation task is statistically harder in nonparametric models.

These models often use smoothing or kernels.

== Example ==
A well-known example of a semiparametric model is the Cox proportional hazards model. If we are interested in studying the time $T$ to an event such as death due to cancer or failure of a light bulb, the Cox model specifies the following distribution function for $T$:

$$F(t) = 1 - \exp\left(-\int_0^t \lambda_0(u) e^{\beta x} du\right),$$

where $x$ is the covariate vector, and $\beta$ and $\lambda_0(u)$ are unknown parameters. $\theta = (\beta, \lambda_0(u))$. Here $\beta$ is finite-dimensional and is of interest; $\lambda_0(u)$ is an unknown non-negative function of time (known as the baseline hazard function) and is often a nuisance parameter. The set of possible candidates for $\lambda_0(u)$ is infinite-dimensional.

== See also ==
- Semiparametric regression
- Statistical model
- Generalized method of moments
