= Projection body =

In convex geometry, the projection body $\Pi K$ of a convex body $K$ in n-dimensional Euclidean space is the convex body such that for any vector $u\in S^{n-1}$, the support function of $\Pi K$ in the direction u is the (n – 1)-dimensional volume of the projection of K onto the hyperplane orthogonal to u.

Hermann Minkowski showed that the projection body of a convex body is convex. Petty (1967) and Schneider (1967) used projection bodies in their solution to Shephard's problem.

For $K$ a convex body, let $\Pi^\circ K$ denote the polar body of its projection body. There are two remarkable affine isoperimetric inequality for this body. Petty (1971) proved that for all convex bodies $K$,

$$V_n(K)^{n-1} V_n(\Pi^\circ K)\le V_n(B^n)^{n-1} V_n(\Pi^\circ B^n),$$

where $B^n$ denotes the n-dimensional unit ball and $V_n$ is n-dimensional volume, and there is equality precisely for ellipsoids. Zhang (1991) proved that for all convex bodies $K$,

$$V_n(K)^{n-1} V_n(\Pi^\circ K)\ge V_n(T^n)^{n-1} V_n(\Pi^\circ T^n),$$

where $T^n$ denotes any $n$-dimensional simplex, and there is equality precisely for such simplices.

The intersection body IK of K is defined similarly, as the star body such that for any vector u the radial function of IK from the origin in direction u is the (n – 1)-dimensional volume of the intersection of K with the hyperplane u^{⊥}. Equivalently, the radial function of the intersection body IK is the Funk transform of the radial function of K. Intersection bodies were introduced by Lutwak (1988).

Koldobsky (1998a) showed that a centrally symmetric star-shaped body is an intersection body if and only if the function 1/||x|| is a positive definite distribution, where ||x|| is the homogeneous function of degree 1 that is 1 on the boundary of the body, and Koldobsky (1998b) used this to show that the unit balls l^{p}_{n}, 2 < p ≤ ∞ in n-dimensional space with the l^{p} norm are intersection bodies for n=4 but are not intersection bodies for n ≥ 5.

== See also ==
- Busemann–Petty problem
- Shephard's problem
