= Busemann =

Busemann is a German surname. Notable people with the surname include:

- Adolf Busemann (1901–1986), German-American aerospace engineer, Busemann's Biplane
- Frank Busemann (born 1975), German decathlete
- Herbert Busemann (1905–1994), German-American mathematician, Busemann's theorem

== See also ==
- Busemann biplane
- Busemann's theorem
- Busemann function
