= Busemann's theorem =

In mathematics, Busemann's theorem is a theorem in Euclidean geometry and geometric tomography. It was first proved by Herbert Busemann in 1949 and was motivated by his theory of area in Finsler spaces.

== Statement of the theorem ==
Let K be a convex body in n-dimensional Euclidean space R^{n} containing the origin in its interior. Let S be an (n − 2)-dimensional linear subspace of R^{n}. For each unit vector θ in S^{⊥}, the orthogonal complement of S, let S_{θ} denote the (n − 1)-dimensional hyperplane containing θ and S. Define r(θ) to be the (n − 1)-dimensional volume of K ∩ S_{θ}. Let C be the curve {θr(θ)} in S^{⊥}. Then C forms the boundary of a convex body in S^{⊥}.

== See also ==
- Brunn–Minkowski inequality
- Prékopa–Leindler inequality
