= Shephard's problem =

In mathematics, Shephard's problem, is the following geometrical question asked by Geoffrey Colin Shephard in 1964: if K and L are centrally symmetric convex bodies in n-dimensional Euclidean space such that whenever K and L are projected onto a hyperplane, the volume of the projection of K is smaller than the volume of the projection of L, then does it follow that the volume of K is smaller than that of L?

In this case, "centrally symmetric" means that the reflection of K in the origin, −K, is a translate of K, and similarly for L. If π_{k} : R^{n} → Π_{k} is a projection of R^{n} onto some k-dimensional hyperplane Π_{k} (not necessarily a coordinate hyperplane) and V_{k} denotes k-dimensional volume, Shephard's problem is to determine the truth or falsity of the implication

$$V_{k} (\pi_{k} (K)) \leq V_{k} (\pi_{k} (L)) \mbox{ for all } 1 \leq k < n \implies V_{n} (K) \leq V_{n} (L).$$

V_{k}(π_{k}(K)) is sometimes known as the brightness of K and the function V_{k} o π_{k} as a (k-dimensional) brightness function.

In dimensions n = 1 and 2, the answer to Shephard's problem is "yes". In 1967, however, Petty and Schneider showed that the answer is "no" for every n ≥ 3. The solution of Shephard's problem requires Minkowski's first inequality for convex bodies and the notion of projection bodies of convex bodies.

== See also ==
- Busemann–Petty problem
