= Gaoyong Zhang =

American mathematician

- Education: Temple University
- Known for: Convex geometry
- Scientific career
- Fields: Mathematician
- Workplaces: Courant Institute of Mathematical Sciences

Gaoyong Zhang is an American mathematician. He is professor at the Courant Institute of Mathematical Sciences at New York University in New York City. His main research interests are convex geometry and its connections with analysis and information theory.

== Biography ==
Gaoyong Zhang graduated from Temple University in Philadelphia with a PhD in 1995. His advisor was Eric Grinberg. Before he became a professor at the Courant Institute at NYU, he was a member of the Institute of Advanced Study.

Zhang became an Inaugural Fellow of the American Mathematical Society in 2012. He is a member of the editorial board at Advanced Nonlinear Studies (De Gruyter) and at the Proceedings of the American Mathematical Society.

== Work ==
Gaoyong Zhang is known for his inverse of the Petty projection inequality, one of the few inequalities in convex geometry where simplices were proved to be extremals. He obtained a positive solution for the Busemann–Petty problem in $R^4$. He is known for his contributions (in collaboration with Erwin Lutwak and Deane Yang) to the L_{p} Brunn Minkowski Theory and, in particular, his solution to the logarithmic Minkowski problem.

== Selected publications ==
- Zhang, Gaoyong (1991), "Restricted chord projection and affine inequalities", Geometriae Dedicata, 39 (2): 213–222, doi:10.1007/BF00182294, S2CID 123311639
- Lutwak, Erwin; Zhang, Gaoyong (1997), "Blaschke-Santaló inequalities", Journal of Differential Geometry, 47 (1): 1–16, doi:10.4310/jdg/1214460036
- Zhang, Gaoyong (1999), "A positive solution to the Busemann-Petty problem in $\mathbb{R}^4$", Annals of Mathematics, 149 (2): 535–543, doi:10.2307/120974, JSTOR 120974, S2CID 14663005
- Zhang, Gaoyong (1999), "The affine Sobolev inequality", Journal of Differential Geometry, 53: 183–202, doi:10.4310/jdg/1214425451
- Lutwak, Erwin; Yang, Deane; Zhang, Gaoyong (2000), "$L_p$ affine isoperimetric inequalities", Journal of Differential Geometry, 56 (1): 111–132, doi:10.4310/jdg/1090347527
- Lutwak, Erwin; Yang, Deane; Zhang, Gaoyong (2000), "A new ellipsoid associated with convex bodies", Duke Mathematical Journal, 104 (3): 375–390, doi:10.1215/S0012-7094-00-10432-2
- Lutwak, Erwin; Yang, Deane; Zhang, Gaoyong (2002), "Sharp affine $L_p$ Sobolev inequalities", Journal of Differential Geometry, 62 (1): 17–38, doi:10.4310/jdg/1090425527, S2CID 51769607
- Lutwak, Erwin; Yang, Deane; Zhang, Gaoyong (2004), "On the $L_p$-Minkowski problem", Transactions of the American Mathematical Society, 356 (11): 4359–4370, doi:10.1090/S0002-9947-03-03403-2
- Lutwak, Erwin; Yang, Deane; Zhang, Gaoyong (2005), "$L_p$ John ellipsoids", Proceedings of the London Mathematical Society, Series 3, 90 (2): 497–520, doi:10.1112/S0024611504014996, S2CID 121641085
- Haberl, Christoph; Lutwak, Erwin; Yang, Deane; Zhang, Gaoyong (2010), "The even Orlicz Minkowski problem", Advances in Mathematics, 224 (6): 2485–2510, doi:10.1016/j.aim.2010.02.006
- Lutwak, Erwin; Yang, Deane; Zhang, Gaoyong (2010), "Orlicz centroid bodies", Journal of Differential Geometry, 84 (2): 365–387, doi:10.4310/jdg/1274707317
- Lutwak, Erwin; Yang, Deane; Zhang, Gaoyong (2010), "Orlicz projection bodies", Advances in Mathematics, 223 (1): 220–242, doi:10.1016/j.aim.2009.08.002
- Böröczky, Károly J.; Lutwak, Erwin; Yang, Deane; Zhang, Gaoyong (2012), "The log-Brunn—Minkowski inequality" (PDF), Advances in Mathematics, 231 (3–4): 1974–1997, doi:10.1016/j.aim.2012.07.015
- Böröczky, Károly J.; Lutwak, Erwin; Yang, Deane; Zhang, Gaoyong (2013), "The logarithmic Minkowski problem" (PDF), Journal of the American Mathematical Society, 26 (3): 831–852, doi:10.1090/S0894-0347-2012-00741-3
- Huang, Yong; Lutwak, Erwin; Yang, Deane; Zhang, Gaoyong (2016), "Geometric measures in the dual Brunn-Minkowski theory and their associated Minkowski problems" (PDF), Acta Mathematica, 216 (2): 325–388, doi:10.1007/s11511-016-0140-6
- Böröczky, Károly J.; Lutwak, Erwin; Yang, Deane; Zhang, Gaoyong; Zhao, Yiming (2020), "The Gauss image problem" (PDF), Communications on Pure and Applied Mathematics, 73 (7): 1406–1452, doi:10.1002/cpa.21898, S2CID 218957398
- Lutwak, Erwin; Xi, Dongmeng; Yang, Deane; Zhang, Gaoyong (2024), "Chord measures in integral geometry and their Minkowski problems", Communications on Pure and Applied Mathematics, 77 (7): 3277–3330, arXiv:2502.08082, doi:10.1002/cpa.22190
