= MFI =

MFI or M.F.I. may refer to:

== Companies and organizations ==
- MFI Foundation Inc., non-profit science foundation in the Philippines
- MFI (retailer), British retailer
- Media Factory, Inc., anime company
- Messiah Foundation International, a spiritual organization
- Microfinance institution, alternate form of bank in developing countries which provides microcredit lending
- MindFreedom International, group that fights involuntary therapy
- Ministers Fellowship International, fellowship of non-denominational charismatic churches
- Missionary Flights International, a religious charity providing aviation support with DC-3 aircraft

== Other ==
- MFi Program, "Made for iPhone/iPod/iPad", a licensing program for developers of hardware and software for Apple products
- Magnetic field imaging, a noninvasive and contact-free cardiac diagnostic method
- Melt flow index, a measure of the ease of flow of the melt of a thermoplastic polymer
- Micromechanical Flying Insect, ornithopter robot that flies based on insect flight technique
- Mikoyan Project 1.44, MiG-MFI, Russian fighter aircraft project (cancelled)
- Minimum Fisher information, variational principle in information theory
- Money flow index, indicator in technical analysis
- Monetary Financial Institutions, ECB terminology for banks and other financial institutions
