= Milman's reverse Brunn–Minkowski inequality =

In mathematics, particularly, in asymptotic convex geometry, Milman's reverse Brunn–Minkowski inequality is a result due to Vitali Milman that provides a reverse inequality to the famous Brunn–Minkowski inequality for convex bodies in n-dimensional Euclidean space R^{n}. Namely, it bounds the volume of the Minkowski sum of two bodies from above in terms of the volumes of the bodies.

== Introduction ==
Let K and L be convex bodies in R^{n}. The Brunn–Minkowski inequality states that

$$\mathrm{vol}(K+L)^{1/n} \geq \mathrm{vol}(K)^{1/n} + \mathrm{vol}(L)^{1/n}~,$$

where vol denotes n-dimensional Lebesgue measure and the + on the left-hand side denotes Minkowski addition.

In general, no reverse bound is possible, since one can find convex bodies K and L of unit volume so that the volume of their Minkowski sum is arbitrarily large. Milman's theorem states that one can replace one of the bodies by its image under a properly chosen volume-preserving linear map so that the left-hand side of the Brunn–Minkowski inequality is bounded by a constant multiple of the right-hand side.

The result is one of the main structural theorems in the local theory of Banach spaces.

== Statement of the inequality ==
There is a constant C, independent of n, such that for any two centrally symmetric convex bodies K and L in R^{n}, there are volume-preserving linear maps φ and ψ from R^{n} to itself such that for any real numbers s, t > 0

$$\mathrm{vol} ( s \, \varphi K + t \, \psi L )^{1/n} \leq C \left( s\, \mathrm{vol} ( \varphi K )^{1/n} + t\, \mathrm{vol} ( \psi L )^{1/n} \right)~.$$

One of the maps may be chosen to be the identity.
