= Busemann–Petty problem =

Problem in convex geometry

In the mathematical field of convex geometry, the Busemann–Petty problem, introduced by Herbert Busemann and Clinton Myers Petty (1956, problem 1), asks whether it is true that a symmetric convex body with larger central hyperplane sections has larger volume. More precisely, if K, T are symmetric convex bodies in R^{n} such that

$$\mathrm{Vol}_{n-1} \, (K \cap A) \leq \mathrm{Vol}_{n-1} \, (T \cap A)$$

for every hyperplane A passing through the origin, is it true that Vol_{n} K ≤ Vol_{n} T?

Busemann and Petty showed that the answer is positive if K is a ball. In general, the answer is positive in dimensions at most 4, and negative in dimensions at least 5.

== History ==
Unexpectedly at the time, Larman and Claude Ambrose Rogers (1975) showed that the Busemann–Petty problem has a negative solution in dimensions at least 12, and this bound was reduced to dimensions at least 5 by several other authors. Ball (1988) pointed out a particularly simple counterexample: all sections of the unit volume cube have measure at most √2, while in dimensions at least 10 all central sections of the unit volume ball have measure at least √2. Lutwak (1988) introduced intersection bodies, and showed that the Busemann–Petty problem has a positive solution in a given dimension if and only if every symmetric convex body is an intersection body. An intersection body is a star body whose radial function in a given direction u is the volume of the hyperplane section u^{⊥} ∩ K for some fixed star body K. Gardner (1994) used Lutwak's result to show that the Busemann–Petty problem has a positive solution if the dimension is 3. Zhang (1994) claimed incorrectly that the unit cube in R^{4} is not an intersection body, which would have implied that the Busemann–Petty problem has a negative solution if the dimension is at least 4. However Koldobsky (1998a) showed that a centrally symmetric star-shaped body is an intersection body if and only if the function 1/||x|| is a positive definite distribution, where ||x|| is the homogeneous function of degree 1 that is 1 on the boundary of the body, and Koldobsky (1998b) used this to show that the unit balls l^{p}_{n}, 1 < p ≤ ∞ in n-dimensional space with the l^{p} norm are intersection bodies for n = 4 but are not intersection bodies for n ≥ 5, showing that Zhang's result was incorrect. Zhang (1999) then showed that the Busemann–Petty problem has a positive solution in dimension 4. Richard J. Gardner, A. Koldobsky, and T. Schlumprecht (1999) gave a uniform solution for all dimensions.

== See also ==
- Shephard's problem
