= Minkowski's first inequality for convex bodies =

In mathematics, Minkowski's first inequality for convex bodies is a geometrical result due to the German mathematician Hermann Minkowski. The inequality is closely related to the Brunn–Minkowski inequality and the isoperimetric inequality.

== Statement of the inequality ==
Let K and L be two n-dimensional convex bodies in n-dimensional Euclidean space R^{n}. Define a quantity V_{1}(K, L) by

$$n V_{1} (K, L) = \lim_{\varepsilon \downarrow 0} \frac{V (K + \varepsilon L) - V(K)}{\varepsilon},$$

where V denotes the n-dimensional Lebesgue measure and + denotes the Minkowski sum. Then

$$V_{1} (K, L) \geq V(K)^{(n - 1) / n} V(L)^{1 / n},$$

with equality if and only if K and L are homothetic, i.e. are equal up to translation and dilation.

== Remarks ==
- V_{1} is just one example of a class of quantities known as mixed volumes.
- If L is the n-dimensional unit ball B, then n V_{1}(K, B) is the (n − 1)-dimensional surface measure of K, denoted S(K).

== Connection to other inequalities ==
=== The Brunn–Minkowski inequality ===
One can show that the Brunn–Minkowski inequality for convex bodies in R^{n} implies Minkowski's first inequality for convex bodies in R^{n}, and that equality in the Brunn–Minkowski inequality implies equality in Minkowski's first inequality.

=== The isoperimetric inequality ===
By taking L = B, the n-dimensional unit ball, in Minkowski's first inequality for convex bodies, one obtains the isoperimetric inequality for convex bodies in R^{n}: if K is a convex body in R^{n}, then

$$\left( \frac{V(K)}{V(B)} \right)^{1 / n} \leq \left( \frac{S(K)}{S(B)} \right)^{1 / (n - 1)},$$

with equality if and only if K is a ball of some radius.
