= Geodesic bicombing =

In metric geometry, a geodesic bicombing distinguishes a class of geodesics of a metric space. The study of metric spaces with distinguished geodesics traces back to the work of the mathematician Herbert Busemann. The convention to call a collection of paths of a metric space bicombing is due to William Thurston. By imposing a weak global non-positive curvature condition on a geodesic bicombing several results from the theory of CAT(0) spaces and Banach space theory may be recovered in a more general setting.

== Definition ==
Let $(X,d)$ be a metric space. A map $\sigma\colon X\times X\times [0,1]\to X$ is a geodesic bicombing if for all points $x,y\in X$ the map $\sigma_{xy}(\cdot):=\sigma(x,y,\cdot)$ is a unit speed metric geodesic from $x$ to $y$, that is, $\sigma_{xy}(0)=x$, $\sigma_{xy}(1)=y$ and $d(\sigma_{xy}(s), \sigma_{xy}(t))=\vert s-t\vert d(x,y)$ for all real numbers $s,t\in [0,1]$.

== Different classes of geodesic bicombings ==
A geodesic bicombing $\sigma\colon X\times X\times [0,1]\to X$ is:

- reversible if
  $$\sigma_{xy}(t)=\sigma_{yx}(1-t)$$
  for all $x,y\in X$ and $t\in [0,1]$.
- consistent if
  $$\sigma_{xy}((1-\lambda)s+\lambda t)=\sigma_{pq}(\lambda)$$
  whenever $x,y\in X, 0\leq s\leq t\leq 1, p:=\sigma_{xy}(s), q:=\sigma_{xy}(t),$and $\lambda\in [0,1]$.
- conical if
  $$d(\sigma_{xy}(t), \sigma_{x^\prime y^\prime}(t))\leq (1-t)d(x,x^\prime)+t d(y,y^\prime)$$
  for all $x,x^\prime, y, y^\prime\in X$ and $t\in [0,1]$.
- convex if
  $$t\mapsto d(\sigma_{xy}(t), \sigma_{x^\prime y^\prime}(t))$$
  is a convex function on $[0,1]$ for all $x,x^\prime, y, y^\prime\in X$.

== Examples ==
Examples of metric spaces with a conical geodesic bicombing include:

- Banach spaces.
- CAT(0) spaces.
- injective metric spaces.
- the spaces $(P_1(X),W_1),$ where $W_1$ is the first Wasserstein distance.
- any ultralimit or 1-Lipschitz retraction of the above.

== Properties ==
- Every consistent conical geodesic bicombing is convex.
- Every convex geodesic bicombing is conical, but the reverse implication does not hold in general.
- Every proper metric space with a conical geodesic bicombing admits a convex geodesic bicombing.
- Every complete metric space with a conical geodesic bicombing admits a reversible conical geodesic bicombing.
