= Wolfgang Weil (mathematician) =

German mathematician (1945–2018)

Wolfgang Weil (6 April 1945 in Kitzingen – 8 February 2018) was a German mathematician known for his contributions to integral geometry, convex geometry, and stochastic geometry. He was a professor of mathematics at the Karlsruhe Institute of Technology.

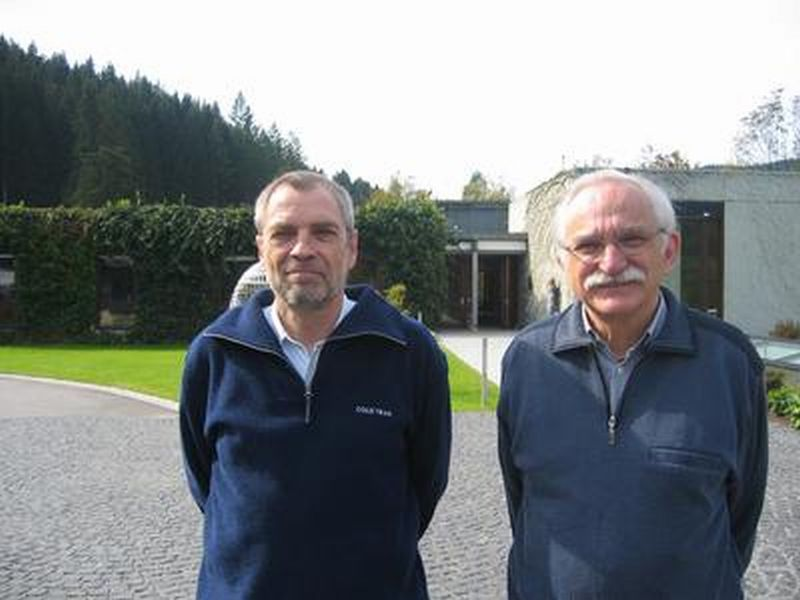
Wolfgang Weil (left) with Rolf Schneider, Oberwolfach 2007

== Education and career ==
Weil received his Ph.D. in mathematics in 1971 from Goethe University Frankfurt. He completed his habilitation in 1976 at the University of Freiburg.

In 1980 he was appointed Professor of Mathematics at the University of Karlsruhe (now Karlsruhe Institute of Technology), where he remained until his death in 2018. He was a guest professor at the University of Oklahoma, Norman, in 1985 and 1990.

== Research ==
Wolfgang Weil worked on integral geometry, convex geometry, and stochastic geometry. He contributed to the theory of valuations on convex bodies, kinematic formulas, and curvature measures. A central theme of his work was the interaction between geometry and probability theory. In 1991, working with Ulrich Betke, he devised the Betke–Weil inequality theorem.

Weil was the coauthor of several books, most notably in long-standing collaboration with Rolf Schneider. Their monograph Stochastic and Integral Geometry is regarded as a comprehensive and authoritative treatment of the field and has been described in reviews as "essential reading", "an essential part of every mathematical library" and "an invaluable source for researchers pursuing studies not only in stochastic geometry".

== Selected publications ==
=== Books ===
- Schneider, Rolf; Weil, Wolfgang (1992). Integralgeometrie. Stuttgart: B. G. Teubner. ISBN 3-519-02734-8.
- Schneider, Rolf; Weil, Wolfgang (2000). Stochastische Geometrie. Stuttgart: B. G. Teubner. ISBN 3-519-02740-2.
- Schneider, Rolf; Weil, Wolfgang (2008). Stochastic and Integral Geometry. Berlin: Springer. ISBN 978-3-540-78858-4.
- Hug, Daniel; Weil, Wolfgang (2020). Lectures on Convex Geometry. Cham: Springer. ISBN 978-3-030-50179-2.

=== Articles ===
- Weil, Wolfgang (1990). "Iterations of translative integral formulae and nonisotropic Poisson processes of particles". Mathematische Zeitschrift. 205 (4): 531–549. doi:10.1007/BF02571261.
- Hug, Daniel; Last, Günter; Weil, Wolfgang (2004). "A local Steiner-type formula for general closed sets and applications". Mathematische Zeitschrift. 246 (1–2): 237–272. doi:10.1007/s00209-003-0597-9.
- Gardner, Richard J.; Hug, Daniel; Weil, Wolfgang (2014). "The Orlicz–Brunn–Minkowski theory: a general framework, additions, and inequalities". Journal of Differential Geometry. 97 (3): 427–476. arXiv:1301.5267. doi:10.4310/jdg/1406033976.
