= Minkowski–Steiner formula =

In mathematics, the Minkowski–Steiner formula is a formula relating the surface area and volume of compact subsets of Euclidean space. More precisely, it defines the surface area as the "derivative" of enclosed volume in an appropriate sense.

The Minkowski–Steiner formula is used, together with the Brunn–Minkowski theorem, to prove the isoperimetric inequality. It is named after Hermann Minkowski and Jakob Steiner.

== Statement of the Minkowski-Steiner formula ==
Let $n \geq 2$, and let $A \subsetneq \mathbb{R}^{n}$ be a compact set. Let $\mu (A)$ denote the Lebesgue measure (volume) of $A$. Define the quantity $\lambda (\partial A)$ by the Minkowski–Steiner formula

$$\lambda (\partial A) := \liminf_{\delta \to 0} \frac{\mu \left( A + \overline{B_{\delta}} \right) - \mu (A)}{\delta},$$

where

$$\overline{B_{\delta}} := \left\{ x = (x_{1}, \dots, x_{n}) \in \mathbb{R}^{n} \left| | x | := \sqrt{x_{1}^{2} + \dots + x_{n}^{2}} \leq \delta \right. \right\}$$

denotes the closed ball of radius $\delta > 0$, and

$$A + \overline{B_{\delta}} := \left\{ a + b \in \mathbb{R}^{n} \left| a \in A, b \in \overline{B_{\delta}} \right. \right\}$$

is the Minkowski sum of $A$ and $\overline{B_{\delta}}$, so that

$$A + \overline{B_{\delta}} = \left\{ x \in \mathbb{R}^{n} \mathrel|\ \mathopen| x - a \mathclose| \leq \delta \mbox{ for some } a \in A \right\}.$$

== Remarks ==
=== Surface measure ===
For "sufficiently regular" sets $A$, the quantity $\lambda (\partial A)$ does indeed correspond with the $(n - 1)$-dimensional measure of the boundary $\partial A$ of $A$. See Federer (1969) for a full treatment of this problem.

=== Convex sets ===
When the set $A$ is a convex set, the lim-inf above is a true limit, and one can show that

$$\mu \left( A + \overline{B_{\delta}} \right) = \mu (A) + \lambda (\partial A) \delta + \sum_{i = 2}^{n - 1} \lambda_{i} (A) \delta^{i} + \omega_{n} \delta^{n},$$

where the $\lambda_{i}$ are some continuous functions of $A$ (see quermassintegrals) and $\omega_{n}$ denotes the measure (volume) of the unit ball in $\mathbb{R}^{n}$:

$$\omega_{n} = \frac{2 \pi^{n / 2}}{n \Gamma (n / 2)},$$

where $\Gamma$ denotes the Gamma function.

== Example: volume and surface area of a ball ==
Taking $A = \overline{B_{R}}$ gives the following well-known formula for the surface area of the sphere of radius $R$, $S_{R} := \partial B_{R}$:

$\lambda (S_{R}) = \lim_{\delta \to 0} \frac{\mu \left( \overline{B_{R}} + \overline{B_{\delta}} \right) - \mu \left( \overline{B_{R}} \right)}{\delta}$

$$= \lim_{\delta \to 0} \frac{[ (R + \delta)^{n} - R^{n} ] \omega_{n}}{\delta}$$
$$= n R^{n - 1} \omega_{n},$$

where $\omega_{n}$ is as above.
