= Mixed volume =

Way to associate a non-negative number to a tuple of convex bodies

In mathematics, more specifically, in convex geometry, the mixed volume is a way to associate a non-negative number to a tuple of convex bodies in $\mathbb{R}^n$. This number depends on the size and shape of the bodies, and their relative orientation to each other.

== Definition ==
Let $K_1, K_2, \dots, K_r$ be convex bodies in $\mathbb{R}^n$ and consider the function

$$f(\lambda_1, \ldots, \lambda_r)
= \mathrm{Vol}_n (\lambda_1 K_1 + \cdots + \lambda_r K_r), \qquad \lambda_i \geq 0,$$

where $\text{Vol}_n$ stands for the $n$-dimensional volume, and its argument is the Minkowski sum of the scaled convex bodies $K_i$. One can show that $f$ is a homogeneous polynomial of degree $n$, so can be written as

$$f(\lambda_1, \ldots, \lambda_r)
= \sum_{j_1, \ldots, j_n = 1}^r V(K_{j_1}, \ldots, K_{j_n})
\lambda_{j_1} \cdots \lambda_{j_n},$$

where the functions $V$ are symmetric. For a particular index function $j \in \{1,\ldots,r\}^n$, the coefficient $V(K_{j_1}, \dots, K_{j_n})$ is called the mixed volume of $K_{j_1}, \dots, K_{j_n}$.

== Properties ==
- The mixed volume is uniquely determined by the following three properties:
1. $V(K, \dots, K) = \text{Vol}_n (K)$;
2. $V$ is symmetric in its arguments;
3. $V$ is multilinear: $V(\lambda K + \lambda' K', K_2, \dots, K_n) = \lambda V(K, K_2, \dots, K_n) + \lambda' V(K', K_2, \dots, K_n)$ for $\lambda,\lambda' \geq 0$.
- The mixed volume is non-negative and monotonically increasing in each variable: $V(K_1, K_2, \ldots, K_n) \leq V(K_1', K_2, \ldots, K_n)$ for $K_1 \subseteq K_1'$.
- The Alexandrov–Fenchel inequality, discovered by Aleksandr Danilovich Aleksandrov and Werner Fenchel:

$$V(K_1, K_2, K_3, \ldots, K_n) \geq \sqrt{V(K_1, K_1, K_3, \ldots, K_n) V(K_2,K_2, K_3,\ldots,K_n)}.$$

Numerous geometric inequalities, such as the Brunn–Minkowski inequality for convex bodies and Minkowski's first inequality, are special cases of the Alexandrov–Fenchel inequality.

== Quermassintegrals ==
Let $K \subset \mathbb{R}^n$ be a convex body and let $B = B_n \subset \mathbb{R}^n$ be the Euclidean ball of unit radius. The mixed volume

$$W_j(K) = V(\overset{n-j \text{ times}}{\overbrace{K,K, \ldots,K}}, \overset{j \text{ times}}{\overbrace{B,B,\ldots,B}})$$

is called the j-th quermassintegral of $K$.

The definition of mixed volume yields the Steiner formula (named after Jakob Steiner):

$$\mathrm{Vol}_n(K + tB)
= \sum_{j=0}^n \binom{n}{j} W_j(K) t^j.$$

=== Intrinsic volumes ===
The j-th intrinsic volume of $K$ is a different normalization of the quermassintegral, defined by

$V_j(K) = \binom{n}{j} \frac{W_{n-j}(K)}{\kappa_{n-j}},$ or in other words $\mathrm{Vol}_n(K + tB) = \sum_{j=0}^n V_j(K)\, \mathrm{Vol}_{n-j}(tB_{n-j}) = \sum_{j=0}^n V_j(K)\,\kappa_{n-j}t^{n-j}.$

where $\kappa_{n-j} = \text{Vol}_{n-j} (B_{n-j})$ is the volume of the $(n-j)$-dimensional unit ball.

=== Hadwiger's characterization theorem ===
Hadwiger's theorem asserts that every valuation on convex bodies in $\mathbb{R}^n$ that is continuous and invariant under rigid motions of $\mathbb{R}^n$ is a linear combination of the quermassintegrals (or, equivalently, of the intrinsic volumes).

=== Interpretation ===
The $i$th intrinsic volume of a compact convex set $A \subseteq R^n$ can also be defined in a more geometric way:

If one chooses at random an $i$-dimensional linear subspace $L$ of $R^n$ and orthogonally projects $A$ onto this subspace $L$ to get $\pi_L(A)$, the expected value of the (Euclidean) $i$-dimensional volume $\mathrm{Vol}(\pi_L(A))$ is equal to $\mathrm{Vol}_i(A)$, up to a constant factor.

In the case of the two-volume of a three-dimensional convex set, it is a theorem of Cauchy that the expected projection to a random plane is proportional to the surface area.

== Examples ==
The intrinsic volumes of $B^n$, the unit ball in $\R^n$, satisfy
$$\begin{aligned}
&V_j\left(B^n\right)=\frac{\kappa_n}{\kappa_{n-j}}\binom{n}{j}, \quad j=0, \ldots, n .\\
&\kappa_m=\operatorname{Vol}_m\left(B^m\right)=\frac{\pi^{m / 2}}{\Gamma\left(\frac{m}{2}+1\right)}
\end{aligned}$$
Given an n-dimensional convex body $K$, the $j$-th intrinsic volume of $K$ satisfies the Cauchy-Kubota formula
$$V_j(K):=\frac{\kappa_n}{\kappa_j \kappa_{n-j}}\binom{n}{j} \int_{\mathrm{G}(n, j)} V_j\left(\operatorname{proj}_E K\right) \mathrm{d} E$$
Here, $\kappa_j$ denotes the $j$-dimensional volume of the $j$-dimensional unit ball, integration is with respect to the Haar probability measure on $\mathrm{G}(n, j)$, the Grassmannian of $j$-dimensional subspaces in $\mathbb{R}^n$, and $\operatorname{proj}_E: \mathbb{R}^n \rightarrow E$ denotes the orthogonal projection onto $E \in \mathrm{G}(n, j)$.
