= Vitale's random Brunn–Minkowski inequality =

In mathematics, Vitale's random Brunn–Minkowski inequality is a theorem due to Richard Vitale that generalizes the classical Brunn–Minkowski inequality for compact subsets of n-dimensional Euclidean space R^{n} to random compact sets.

== Statement of the inequality ==
Let X be a random compact set in R^{n}; that is, a Borel–measurable function from some probability space (Ω, Σ, Pr) to the space of non-empty, compact subsets of R^{n} equipped with the Hausdorff metric. A random vector V : Ω → R^{n} is called a selection of X if Pr(V ∈ X) = 1. If K is a non-empty, compact subset of R^{n}, let

$$\| K \| = \max \left\{ \left. \| v \|_{\mathbb{R}^{n}} \right| v \in K \right\}$$

and define the set-valued expectation E[X] of X to be

$$\mathrm{E} [X] = \{ \mathrm{E} [V] | V \mbox{ is a selection of } X \mbox{ and } \mathrm{E} \| V \| < + \infty \}.$$

Note that E[X] is a subset of R^{n}. In this notation, Vitale's random Brunn–Minkowski inequality is that, for any random compact set X with $E[\|X\|]<+\infty$,

$$\left( \mathrm{vol}_n \left( \mathrm{E} [X] \right) \right)^{1/n} \geq \mathrm{E} \left[ \mathrm{vol}_n (X)^{1/n} \right],$$

where "$vol_n$" denotes n-dimensional Lebesgue measure.

== Relationship to the Brunn–Minkowski inequality ==
If X takes the values (non-empty, compact sets) K and L with probabilities 1 − λ and λ respectively, then Vitale's random Brunn–Minkowski inequality is simply the original Brunn–Minkowski inequality for compact sets.
