= Rolf Schneider =

German mathematician

- Born: Rolf Georg Schneider; 17 March 1940 (age 86); Hagen, Germany
- Education: Johann Wolfgang Goethe-Universität Frankfurt am Main
- Known for: Convex geometry, Stochastic geometry
- Scientific career
- Fields: Mathematician
- Workplaces: University of Freiburg
- Doctoral advisor: Ruth Moufang

Rolf Georg Schneider (born 17 March 1940, Hagen, Germany) is a mathematician. Schneider is a professor emeritus at the University of Freiburg. His main research interests are convex geometry and stochastic geometry.

== Career ==
Schneider completed his PhD 1967 with Ruth Moufang at Goethe University Frankfurt with a thesis titled (Elliptisch gekrümmte Hyperflächen in der affinen Differentialgeometrie im Großen). In 1969, he got his Habilitation in Bochum. In 1970, he was appointed as a full professor at Technische Universität Berlin and in 1974 at the University of Freiburg.

He became a Fellow of the American Mathematical Society in 2015 and received an honorary doctorate of the University of Salzburg in 2004.

=== Research ===
Rolf Schneider is known for his solution of Shephard's problem, his books on stochastic and integral geometry in long-standing collaboration with Wolfgang Weil, and his comprehensive monography on the Brunn–Minkowski theory.
