= Erwin Lutwak =

American mathematician

- Born: 9 February 1946 (age 80); Chernivtsi, Ukraine
- Education: New York University Tandon School of Engineering
- Known for: Convex geometry
- Scientific career
- Fields: Mathematician
- Workplaces: Courant Institute of Mathematical Sciences; New York University Tandon School of Engineering
- Doctoral advisor: Heinrich Guggenheimer

Erwin Lutwak (born 9 February 1946, Chernivtsi, now Ukraine), is a mathematician. Lutwak is professor emeritus at the Courant Institute of Mathematical Sciences at New York University in New York City. His main research interests are convex geometry and its connections with analysis and information theory.

== Biography ==
He spent the earliest years of his childhood in the Soviet Union, Romania, Israel, Italy, and Venezuela before he settled in Brooklyn when he was ten. He graduated from the Polytechnic Institute of Brooklyn, now New York University Tandon School of Engineering with a B.S. in 1968, a M.S. in 1972 and with a Ph.D. in 1974. Before he became professor at the Courant Institute at NYU, he was a professor at New York University Tandon School of Engineering. His first position in 1975 was at the Polytechnic Institute of New York (which was created as a result of the merger of the Polytechnic Institute of Brooklyn and the NYU School of Engineering).

He is a member of the editorial boards of the Advances in Mathematics, the Canadian Journal of Mathematics, the Canadian Mathematical Bulletin, and the Cambridge University Press Encyclopedia of Mathematics and its Applications. He is an Honorary Editor at Advanced Nonlinear Studies (De Gruyter).

== Work ==
Erwin Lutwak is known for his Dual Brunn Minkowski Theory, his notion of intersection body and his contribution to the solution of the Busemann–Petty problem, for proving the long-conjectured upper-semicontinuity of affine surface area, his contributions to the L_{p} Brunn Minkowski Theory and, in particular, his L_{p} Minkowski problem and its solution in important cases.

== Honors ==
- Lutwak became an Inaugural Fellow of the American Mathematical Society in 2012.
- He received an honorary doctorate of the TU Wien in 2014.

== Personal life ==
Dr. Lutwak is married to Nancy Lutwak, M.D.. They have one daughter, Hope Lutwak, who graduated with a Bachelor of Science in 2018 from the Massachusetts Institute of Technology. The family resides in Manhattan.

== Notable publications ==
- Lutwak, Erwin (1975), "Dual mixed volumes", Pacific Journal of Mathematics, 58 (2): 531–538, doi:10.2140/pjm.1975.58.531
- Lutwak, Erwin (1988), "Intersection bodies and dual mixed volumes", Advances in Mathematics, 71 (2): 232–261, doi:10.1016/0001-8708(88)90077-1
- Lutwak, Erwin (1990), "Centroid bodies and dual mixed volumes", Proceedings of the London Mathematical Society, Series 3, 60 (2): 365–391, doi:10.1112/plms/s3-60.2.365
- Lutwak, Erwin (1993), "The Brunn-Minkowski-Firey theory I: Mixed volumes and the Minkowski problem", Journal of Differential Geometry, 38 (1): 131–150, doi:10.4310/jdg/1214454097
- Lutwak, Erwin; Oliker, Vladimir (1995), "On the regularity of solutions to a generalization of the Minkowski problem", Journal of Differential Geometry, 41 (1): 227–246, doi:10.4310/jdg/1214456011
- Lutwak, Erwin (1996), "The Brunn-Minkowski-Firey theory II: Affine and geominimal surface areas", Advances in Mathematics, 118 (2): 244–294, doi:10.1006/aima.1996.0022
- Lutwak, Erwin; Zhang, Gaoyong (1997), "Blaschke-Santaló inequalities", Journal of Differential Geometry, 47 (1): 1–16, doi:10.4310/jdg/1214460036
- Lutwak, Erwin; Yang, Deane; Zhang, Gaoyong (2000), "$L_p$ affine isoperimetric inequalities", Journal of Differential Geometry, 56 (1): 111–132, doi:10.4310/jdg/1090347527
- Lutwak, Erwin; Yang, Deane; Zhang, Gaoyong (2000), "A new ellipsoid associated with convex bodies", Duke Mathematical Journal, 104 (3): 375–390, doi:10.1215/S0012-7094-00-10432-2
- Lutwak, Erwin; Yang, Deane; Zhang, Gaoyong (2002), "Sharp affine $L_p$ Sobolev inequalities", Journal of Differential Geometry, 62 (1): 17–38, doi:10.4310/jdg/1090425527
- Lutwak, Erwin; Yang, Deane; Zhang, Gaoyong (2004), "On the $L_p$-Minkowski problem", Transactions of the American Mathematical Society, 356 (11): 4359–4370, doi:10.1090/S0002-9947-03-03403-2
- Lutwak, Erwin; Yang, Deane; Zhang, Gaoyong (2005), "$L_p$ John ellipsoids", Proceedings of the London Mathematical Society, Series 3, 90 (2): 497–520, doi:10.1112/S0024611504014996, S2CID 121641085
- Haberl, Christoph; Lutwak, Erwin; Yang, Deane; Zhang, Gaoyong (2010), "The even Orlicz Minkowski problem", Advances in Mathematics, 224 (6): 2485–2510, doi:10.1016/j.aim.2010.02.006
- Lutwak, Erwin; Yang, Deane; Zhang, Gaoyong (2010), "Orlicz centroid bodies", Journal of Differential Geometry, 84 (2): 365–387, doi:10.4310/jdg/1274707317
- Lutwak, Erwin; Yang, Deane; Zhang, Gaoyong (2010), "Orlicz projection bodies", Advances in Mathematics, 223 (1): 220–242, doi:10.1016/j.aim.2009.08.002
- Böröczky, Károly J.; Lutwak, Erwin; Yang, Deane; Zhang, Gaoyong (2012), "The log-Brunn—Minkowski inequality", Advances in Mathematics, 231 (3–4): 1974–1997, doi:10.1016/j.aim.2012.07.015
- Böröczky, Károly J.; Lutwak, Erwin; Yang, Deane; Zhang, Gaoyong (2013), "The logarithmic Minkowski problem", Journal of the American Mathematical Society, 26 (3): 831–852, arXiv:2502.05430, doi:10.1090/S0894-0347-2012-00741-3
- Huang, Yong; Lutwak, Erwin; Yang, Deane; Zhang, Gaoyong (2016), "Geometric measures in the dual Brunn-Minkowski theory and their associated Minkowski problems", Acta Mathematica, 216 (2): 325–388, arXiv:2502.05436, doi:10.1007/s11511-016-0140-6
- Böröczky, Károly J.; Lutwak, Erwin; Yang, Deane; Zhang, Gaoyong; Zhao, Yiming (2020), "The Gauss image problem", Communications on Pure and Applied Mathematics, 73 (7): 1406–1452, doi:10.1002/cpa.21898, hdl:20.500.14018/13832
- Lutwak, Erwin; Xi, Dongmeng; Yang, Deane; Zhang, Gaoyong (2024), "Chord measures in integral geometry and their Minkowski problems", Communications on Pure and Applied Mathematics, 77 (7): 3277–3330, arXiv:2502.08082, doi:10.1002/cpa.22190
