= Advances in Mathematics =

- Discipline: Mathematics
- Language: English
- Edited by: Michael J. Hopkins, Tomasz Mrowka, Gang Tian

Publication details
- History: 1961–present
- Publisher: Elsevier
- Frequency: 18/year
- Open access: Hybrid
- Impact factor: 1.688 (2020)

Standard abbreviations
- ISO 4: Adv. Math.

Indexing
- ISSN: 0001-8708 (print); 1090-2082 (web)
- OCLC no.: 1588740

Links
- Journal homepage

Advances in Mathematics is a peer-reviewed scientific journal covering research on pure mathematics. It was established in 1961 by Gian-Carlo Rota. The journal publishes 18 issues each year, in three volumes.

At the origin, the journal aimed at publishing articles addressed to a broader "mathematical community", and not only to mathematicians in the author's field. Herbert Busemann writes, in the preface of the first issue, "The need for expository articles addressing either all mathematicians or only those in somewhat related fields has long been felt, but little has been done outside of the USSR. The serial publication Advances in Mathematics was created in response to this demand."

== Abstracting and indexing ==
The journal is abstracted and indexed in:

- CompuMath Citation Index
- Current Contents/Physical, Chemical & Earth Sciences
- Mathematical Reviews
- Science Citation Index
- Scopus
- Zentralblatt MATH

== See also ==
- List of periodicals published by Elsevier
