= Prékopa–Leindler inequality =

Integral inequality

In mathematics, the Prékopa–Leindler inequality is an integral inequality closely related to the reverse Young's inequality, the Brunn–Minkowski inequality and a number of other important and classical inequalities in analysis. The result is named after the Hungarian mathematicians András Prékopa and László Leindler.

== Statement of the inequality ==
Let 0 < λ < 1 and let f, g, h : R^{n} → [0, +∞) be non-negative real-valued measurable functions defined on n-dimensional Euclidean space R^{n}. Suppose that these functions satisfy

$h \left( (1-\lambda)x + \lambda y \right) \geq f(x)^{1 - \lambda} g(y)^\lambda$	1

for all x and y in R^{n}. Then

$$\| h\|_{1} := \int_{\mathbb{R}^n} h(x) \, \mathrm{d} x \geq \left( \int_{\mathbb{R}^n} f(x) \, \mathrm{d} x \right)^{1 -\lambda} \left( \int_{\mathbb{R}^n} g(x) \, \mathrm{d} x \right)^\lambda =: \| f\|_1^{1 -\lambda} \| g\|_1^\lambda.$$

== Essential form of the inequality ==
Recall that the essential supremum of a measurable function f : R^{n} → R is defined by

$$\mathop{\mathrm{ess\,sup}}_{x \in \mathbb{R}^{n}} f(x) = \inf \left\{ t \in [- \infty, + \infty] \mid f(x) \leq t \text{ for almost all } x \in \mathbb{R}^{n} \right\}.$$

This notation allows the following essential form of the Prékopa–Leindler inequality: let 0 < λ < 1 and let f, g ∈ L^{1}(R^{n}; [0, +∞)) be non-negative absolutely integrable functions. Let

$$s(x) = \mathop{\mathrm{ess\,sup}}_{y \in \mathbb{R}^n} f \left( \frac{x - y}{1 - \lambda} \right)^{1 - \lambda} g \left( \frac{y}{\lambda} \right)^\lambda.$$

Then s is measurable and

$$\| s \|_1 \geq \| f \|_1^{1 - \lambda} \| g \|_1^\lambda.$$

The essential supremum form was given by Herm Brascamp and Elliott Lieb. Its use can change the left side of the inequality. For example, a function g that takes the value 1 at exactly one point will not usually yield a zero left side in the "non-essential sup" form but it will always yield a zero left side in the "essential sup" form.

== Relationship to the Brunn–Minkowski inequality ==
It can be shown that the usual Prékopa–Leindler inequality implies the Brunn–Minkowski inequality in the following form: if 0 < λ < 1 and A and B are bounded, measurable subsets of R^{n} such that the Minkowski sum (1 − λ)A + λB is also measurable, then

$$\mu \left( (1 - \lambda) A + \lambda B \right) \geq \mu (A)^{1 - \lambda} \mu (B)^{\lambda},$$

where μ denotes n-dimensional Lebesgue measure. Hence, the Prékopa–Leindler inequality can also be used to prove the Brunn–Minkowski inequality in its more familiar form: if 0 < λ < 1 and A and B are non-empty, bounded, measurable subsets of R^{n} such that (1 − λ)A + λB is also measurable, then

$$\mu \left( (1 - \lambda) A + \lambda B \right)^{1 / n} \geq (1 - \lambda) \mu (A)^{1 / n} + \lambda \mu (B)^{1 / n}.$$

== Applications in probability and statistics ==
=== Log-concave distributions ===
The Prékopa–Leindler inequality is useful in the theory of log-concave distributions, as it can be used to show that log-concavity is preserved by marginalization and independent summation of log-concave distributed random variables. Since, if $X, Y$ have pdf $f, g$, and $X, Y$ are independent, then $f\star g$ is the pdf of $X+Y$, we also have that the convolution of two log-concave functions is log-concave.

Suppose that H(x,y) is a log-concave distribution for (x,y) ∈ R^{m} × R^{n}, so that by definition we have

$H \left( (1 - \lambda)(x_1,y_1) + \lambda (x_2,y_2) \right) \geq H(x_1,y_1)^{1 - \lambda} H(x_2,y_2)^{\lambda},$	2

and let M(y) denote the marginal distribution obtained by integrating over x:

$$M(y) = \int_{\mathbb{R}^m} H(x,y) \, dx.$$

Let y_{1}, y_{2} ∈ R^{n} and 0 < λ < 1 be given. Then equation (2) satisfies condition (1) with h(x) = H(x,(1 − λ)y_{1} + λy_{2}), f(x) = H(x,y_{1}) and g(x) = H(x,y_{2}), so the Prékopa–Leindler inequality applies. It can be written in terms of M as

$$M((1-\lambda) y_1 + \lambda y_2) \geq M(y_1)^{1-\lambda} M(y_2)^\lambda,$$

which is the definition of log-concavity for M.

To see how this implies the preservation of log-convexity by independent sums, suppose that X and Y are independent random variables with log-concave distribution. Since the product of two log-concave functions is log-concave, the joint distribution of (X,Y) is also log-concave. Log-concavity is preserved by affine changes of coordinates, so the distribution of (X + Y, X − Y) is log-concave as well. Since the distribution of X+Y is a marginal over the joint distribution of (X + Y, X − Y), we conclude that X + Y has a log-concave distribution.

=== Applications to concentration of measure ===
The Prékopa–Leindler inequality can be used to prove results about concentration of measure.

Theorem Let $A \subseteq \mathbb{R}^n$, and set $A_{\epsilon} = \{ x : d(x,A) < \epsilon \}$. Let $\gamma(x)$ denote the standard Gaussian pdf, and $\mu$ its associated measure. Then $\mu(A_{\epsilon}) \geq 1 - \frac{ e^{ - \epsilon^2/4}}{\mu(A)}$.

Proof of concentration of measure

The proof of this theorem goes by way of the following lemma:

Lemma In the notation of the theorem, $\int_{\mathbb{R}^n} \exp ( d(x,A)^2/4) d\mu \leq 1/\mu(A)$.

This lemma can be proven from Prékopa–Leindler by taking $h(x) = \gamma(x), f(x) = e^{ \frac{ d(x,A)^2}{4}} \gamma(x), g(x) = 1_A(x) \gamma(x)$ and $\lambda = 1/2$. To verify the hypothesis of the inequality, $h( \frac{ x + y}{2} ) \geq \sqrt{ f(x) g(y)}$, note that we only need to consider $y \in A$, in which case $d(x,A) \leq ||x - y||$. This allows us to calculate:

$$(2 \pi)^n f(x) g(x) = \exp( \frac{ d(x,A) }{4} - ||x||^2/2 - ||y||^2/2 ) \leq \exp( \frac{ ||x - y||^2 }{4} - ||x||^2/2 - ||y||^2/2 ) = \exp ( - ||\frac{x + y}{2}||^2 ) = (2 \pi)^n  h( \frac{ x + y}{2})^2.$$

Since $\int h(x) dx = 1$, the PL-inequality immediately gives the lemma.

To conclude the concentration inequality from the lemma, note that on $\mathbb{R}^n \setminus A_{\epsilon}$, $d(x,A) > \epsilon$, so we have $\int_{\mathbb{R}^n} \exp ( d(x,A)^2/4) d\mu \geq ( 1 - \mu(A_{\epsilon})) \exp ( \epsilon^2/4)$. Applying the lemma and rearranging proves the result.
