= Herbert Busemann =

German-American mathematician (1905–1994)

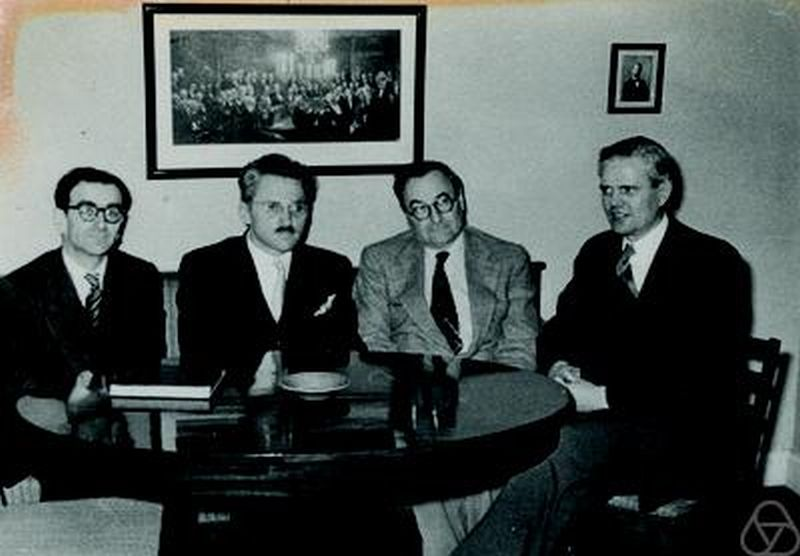
Werner Fenchel, Aleksandr Danilovich Aleksandrov, Herbert Busemann, Børge Jessen (1954).

Herbert Busemann (12 May 1905 – 3 February 1994) was a German-American mathematician specializing in convex and differential geometry. He is the author of Busemann's theorem in Euclidean geometry and geometric tomography. He was a member of the Royal Danish Academy and a winner of the Lobachevsky Medal (1985), the first American mathematician to receive it. He was also a Fulbright scholar in New Zealand in 1952.

== Biography ==
Herbert Busemann was born in Berlin to a well-to-do family. His father, Alfred Busemann, was a director of Krupp, where Busemann also worked for several years. He studied at the Ludwig-Maximilians-Universität München (LMU), the University of Paris, and Sapienza University of Rome. He defended his dissertation at University of Göttingen in 1931, where his advisor was Richard Courant. He remained in Göttingen as an assistant until 1933, when he escaped Nazi Germany to Copenhagen (he had a Jewish grandfather). He worked at the University of Copenhagen until 1936, when he left to the United States. There, he got married in 1939 and naturalized in 1943. He had temporary positions at the Institute for Advanced Study, Johns Hopkins University, Illinois Institute of Technology, Smith College, and eventually became a professor in 1947 at University of Southern California. He advanced to a distinguished professor in 1964, and continued working at USC until his retirement in 1970. Over the course of his work at USC, he supervised over 10 Ph.D. students.

He is the author of six monographs, two of which were translated into Russian. He received Lobachevsky Medal in 1985 for his book The geometry of geodesics.

Busemann was also an active mathematical citizen. At different times, he was the president of the California chapter of Mathematical Association of America, and a member of the council of the American Mathematical Society.

Busemann was also an accomplished linguist; he was able to read and speak in French, German, Spanish, Italian, Russian, and Danish. He could also read Arabic, Latin, Greek and Swedish. He translated a number of papers and monograph, most notably from Russian, a rare language at the time. He was also an accomplished artist and had several public exhibitions of his Hard-edge paintings]. He died in Santa Ynez, California on February 3, 1994, at the age of 88.

Busemann's Selected papers are now available in two volumes (908 and 842 pages), with introductory biographical material and commentaries on his work, and published by edited by Athanase Papadopoulos, Springer Verlag, 2018.

== Books ==
- Herbert Busemann, Selected Works, (Athanase Papadopoulos, ed.) Volume I, ISBN 978-3-319-64294-9, XXXII, 908 p., Springer International Publishing, 2018.
- Herbert Busemann, Selected Works, (Athanase Papadopoulos, ed.) Volume II, ISBN 978-3-319-65623-6, XXXV, 842 p., Springer International Publishing, 2018.
- Introduction to algebraic manifolds, Princeton University Press, 1939.
- with Paul J. Kelly: Projective geometry and projective metrics, Academic Press, 1953, Dover 2006.
- Convex Surfaces, Interscience 1958, Dover, 2008.
- Geometry of Geodesics, Academic Press 1955, Dover, 2005.
- Metric methods in Finsler spaces and in the foundations of geometry, Princeton University Press, Oxford University Press, 1942.
- with Bhalchandra Phadke: Spaces with distinguished geodesics, Dekker, 1987.
- Recent synthetic differential geometry, Springer 1970.

== See also ==
- Blaschke–Busemann measure
- Busemann function
- Busemann–Petty problem
- Busemann G-space
- Geodesic bicombing
