= Convex body =

Non-empty convex set in Euclidean space

A dodecahedron is a convex body.

In mathematics, a convex body in $n$-dimensional Euclidean space $\R^n$ is a compact convex set with non-empty interior. Some authors do not require a non-empty interior, merely that the set is non-empty.

A convex body $K$ is called symmetric if it is centrally symmetric with respect to the origin; that is to say, a point $x$ lies in $K$ if and only if its antipode, $- x$ also lies in $K.$ Symmetric convex bodies are in a one-to-one correspondence with the unit balls of norms on $\R^n.$

Some commonly known examples of convex bodies are the Euclidean ball, the hypercube and the cross-polytope.

== Metric space structure ==
Write $\mathcal K^n$ for the set of convex bodies in $\mathbb R^n$. Then $\mathcal K^n$ is a complete metric space with metric
$$d(K,L) := \inf\{\epsilon \geq 0 : K \subset L + B^n(\epsilon), L \subset K + B^n(\epsilon) \}.$$

Further, the Blaschke Selection Theorem says that every d-bounded sequence in $\mathcal K^n$ has a convergent subsequence.

== Polar body ==
If $K$ is a bounded convex body containing the origin $O$ in its interior, the polar body $K^*$ is $\{u : \langle u,v \rangle \leq 1, \forall v \in K \}$. The polar body has several nice properties including $(K^*)^*=K$, $K^*$ is bounded, and if $K_1\subset K_2$ then $K_2^*\subset K_1^*$. The polar body is a type of duality relation.

== See also ==
- List of convexity topics
- John ellipsoid – Ellipsoid most closely containing, or contained in, an n-dimensional convex object
- Brunn–Minkowski theorem, which has many implications relevant to the geometry of convex bodies.
