= List of statistical tests =

Statistical tests are used to test the fit between a hypothesis and the data. Choosing the right statistical test is not a trivial task. The choice of the test depends on many properties of the research question. The vast majority of studies can be addressed by 30 of the 100 or so statistical tests in use.

== Explanation of properties ==
- Scaling of data: One of the properties of the tests is the scale of the data, which can be interval-based, ordinal or nominal. Nominal scale is also known as categorical. Interval scale is also known as numerical. When categorical data has only two possibilities, it is called binary or dichotomous.
- Assumptions, parametric and non-parametric: There are two groups of statistical tests, parametric and non-parametric. The choice between these two groups needs to be justified. Parametric tests assume that the data follow a particular distribution, typically a normal distribution, while non-parametric tests make no assumptions about the distribution. Non-parametric tests have the advantage of being more resistant to misbehaviour of the data, such as outliers. They also have the disadvantage of being less certain in the statistical estimate.
- Type of data: Statistical tests use different types of data. Some tests perform univariate analysis on a single sample with a single variable. Others compare two or more paired or unpaired samples. Unpaired samples are also called independent samples. Paired samples are also called dependent. Finally, there are some statistical tests that perform analysis of relationship between multiple variables like regression.
- Number of samples: The number of samples of data.
- Exactness: A test can be exact or be asymptotic delivering approximate results.

== List of statistical tests ==
Test name	Scaling	Assumptions	Data	Samples	Exact	Special case of	Application conditions
One sample t-test	interval	normal	univariate	1	No	Location test	
Paired difference test			paired	2		Location test	
Unpaired t-test	interval	normal	unpaired	2	No	Location test	Homoscedasticity
Welch's t-test	interval	normal	unpaired	2	No	Location test	
Paired t-test	interval	normal	paired	2	No	Location test	
F-test	interval	normal	unpaired	2			
Z-test (one mean)	interval	normal	univariate	1	No		variance is known
Z-test (two means)	interval	normal		2	No		variances are known
Permutation test	interval	non-parametric	unpaired	≥2	Yes		
Kruskal-Wallis $H$ test	ordinal	non-parametric	unpaired	≥2	Yes		small sample size
Mann–Whitney $U$ test	ordinal	non-parametric	unpaired	2		Kruskal-Wallis test	
Wilcoxon signed-rank test	interval	non-parametric	paired	≥1		Location test	
Sign test	ordinal	non-parametric	paired	2			
Friedman test	ordinal	non-parametric	paired	>2		Location test	
$\chi^2$ test	nominal	non-parametric			No		Contingency table, sample size > ca. 60, any cell content ≥ 5, marginal totals fixed
Pearson's $\chi^2$ test	nominal/ordinal	non-parametric			No	$\chi^2$ test	
Median test	ordinal	non-parametric			No	Pearson's $\chi^2$ test	
Multinomial test	nominal	non-parametric	univariate	1	Yes	Location test	
McNemar's test	binary	non-parametric	paired	2	Yes	Cochran's $Q$ test	
Cochran's $Q$ test	binary	non-parametric	paired	≥2			
Binomial test	binary	non-parametric	univariate	1	Yes	Multinomial test	
Siegel–Tukey test	ordinal	non-parametric	unpaired	2			
Chow test	interval	parametric	linear regression	2	No		Time series
Fisher's exact test	nominal	non-parametric	unpaired	≥2	Yes		Contingency table, marginal totals fixed
Barnard's exact test	nominal	non-parametric	unpaired	2	Yes		Contingency table
Boschloo's test	nominal	non-parametric	unpaired	2	Yes		Contingency table
Shapiro–Wilk test	interval		univariate	1		Normality test	sample size between 3 and 5000
Kolmogorov–Smirnov test	interval			1		Normality test	distribution parameters known
Shapiro-Francia test	interval		univariate	1		Normality test	Simplification of Shapiro–Wilk test
Lilliefors test	interval			1		Normality test	

== See also ==
- List of probability distributions
