= Location testing for Gaussian scale mixture distributions =

In statistics, the topic of location testing for Gaussian scale mixture distributions arises in some particular types of situations where the more standard Student's t-test is inapplicable. Specifically, these cases allow tests of location to be made where the assumption that sample observations arise from populations having a normal distribution can be replaced by the assumption that they arise from a Gaussian scale mixture distribution. The class of Gaussian scale mixture distributions contains all symmetric stable distributions, Laplace distributions, logistic distributions, and exponential power distributions, etc.

Introduce

t^{G}_{n}(x),

the counterpart of Student's t-distribution for Gaussian scale mixtures. This means that if we test the null hypothesis that the center of a Gaussian scale mixture distribution is 0, say, then t_{n}^{G}(x) (x ≥ 0) is the infimum of all monotone nondecreasing functions u(x) ≥ 1/2, x ≥ 0 such that if the critical values of the test are u^{−1}(1 − α), then the significance level is at most α ≥ 1/2 for all Gaussian scale mixture distributions [t^{G}_{n}(x) = 1 − t^{G}_{n}(−x), for x < 0]. An explicit formula for t^{G}_{n}(x), is given in the papers in the references in terms of Student’s t-distributions, t_{k}, k = 1, 2, ..., n. Introduce

Φ^{G}(x):= lim_{n → ∞} t^{G}_{n}(x),

the Gaussian scale mixture counterpart of the standard normal cumulative distribution function, Φ(x).

Theorem. Φ^{G}(x) = 1/2 for 0 ≤ x < 1, Φ^{G}(1) = 3/4, Φ^{G}(x) = C(x/(2 − x^{2})^{1/2}) for quantiles between 1/2 and 0.875, where C(x) is the standard Cauchy cumulative distribution function. This is the convex part of the curve Φ^{G}(x), x ≥ 0 which is followed by a linear section Φ^{G}(x) = x/(2√3) + 1/2 for 1.3136... < x < 1.4282... Thus the 90% quantile is exactly 4√3/5. Most importantly,

Φ^{G}(x) = Φ(x) for x ≥ √3.

Note that Φ(√3) = 0.958..., thus the classical 95% confidence interval for the unknown expected value of Gaussian distributions covers the center of symmetry with at least 95% probability for Gaussian scale mixture distributions. On the other hand, the 90% quantile of Φ^{G}(x) is 4√3/5 = 1.385... > Φ^{−1}(0.9) = 1.282... The following critical values are important in applications: 0.95 = Φ(1.645) = Φ^{G}(1.651), and 0.9 = Φ(1.282) = Φ^{G}(1.386).

For the extension of the Theorem to all symmetric unimodal distributions one can start with a classical result of Aleksandr Khinchin: namely that all symmetric unimodal distributions are scale mixtures of symmetric uniform distributions.

== Open problem ==
The counterpart of the Theorem above for the class of all symmetric distributions, or equivalently, for the class of scale mixtures of coin flipping random variables, leads to the following problem:

How many vertices of an n-dimensional unit cube can be covered by a sphere with given radius r (and varying center)? Answer this question for all positive integers n and all positive real numbers r. (Certain special cases can be easy to compute.)
