= Samuel Sanford Shapiro =

American statistician and engineer (1930–2023)

- Born: July 13, 1930; New York City, New York, U.S.
- Died: November 5, 2023 (aged 93); Miami, Florida, U.S.
- Education: Rutgers University; Columbia University; City College of New York
- Known for: Shapiro–Wilk test Shapiro–Francia test
- Scientific career
- Fields: Statistics
- Workplaces: Florida International University

Samuel Sanford Shapiro (July 13, 1930 – November 5, 2023) was an American statistician and engineer. He was a professor emeritus of statistics at Florida International University. He was known for his co-authorship of the Shapiro–Wilk test and the Shapiro–Francia test.

A native of New York City, Shapiro graduated from City College of New York with a degree in statistics in 1952, and took an MS in industrial engineering at Columbia University in 1954. He briefly served as a statistician in the US Army Chemical Corps, before earning a MS (1960) and PhD (1963) in statistics at Rutgers University. In 1972 he joined the faculty at Florida International University.

In 1987 he was elected a Fellow of the American Statistical Association.

Shapiro died on November 5, 2023, at the age of 93.
