= Paired data =

Scientific experiments often require comparing two (or more) sets of data. In some cases, the data sets are paired, meaning there is an obvious and meaningful one-to-one correspondence between the data in the first set and the data in the second set, compare Blocking (statistics).

For example, paired data can arise from measuring a single set of individuals at different points in time. A clinical trial might record the blood pressure in a set of n patients before and after administering a medicine. In this case, the "before" and "after" data sets are paired, as each patient has a "before" measurement and an "after" measurement, that are likely related. In contrast, another clinical trial might measure n patients before treatment and a different set of m patients after treatment; in that case, the "before" and "after" data are unpaired.

Statistical tests used to compare sets of data have been designed for data sets that are either paired or unpaired, making it important to use the correct test to prevent erroneous results. Tests for paired data include McNemar's test and the paired permutation test. Tests for unpaired data include Pearson's chi-squared test and Fisher's exact test.

== See also ==
- Paired difference test
- Variance reduction
- Randomized block design
