= Location test =

A location test is a statistical hypothesis test that compares the location parameter of a statistical population to a given constant, or that compares the location parameters of two statistical populations to each other. Most commonly, the location parameter (or parameters) of interest are expected values, but location tests based on medians or other measures of location are also used.

== One-sample location test ==
The one-sample location test compares the location parameter of one sample to a given constant. An example of a one-sample location test would be a comparison of the location parameter for the blood pressure distribution of a population to a given reference value. In a one-sided test, it is stated before the analysis is carried out that it is only of interest if the location parameter is either larger than, or smaller than the given constant, whereas in a two-sided test, a difference in either direction is of interest.

== Two-sample location test ==
The two-sample location test compares the location parameters of two samples to each other. A common situation is where the two populations correspond to research subjects who have been treated with two different treatments (one of them possibly being a control or placebo). In this case, the goal is to assess whether one of the treatments typically yields a better response than the other. In a one-sided test, it is stated before the analysis is carried out that it is only of interest if a particular treatment yields the better responses, whereas in a two-sided test, it is of interest whether either of the treatments is superior to the other.

The following tables provide guidance to the selection of the proper parametric or non-parametric statistical tests for a given data set.

== Parametric and nonparametric location tests ==
The following table summarizes some common parametric and nonparametric tests for the location parameters of one or more samples.

Ordinal and numerical measures
1 group		N ≥ 30		One-sample t-test
1 group		N < 30	Normally distributed	One-sample t-test
1 group		N < 30	Not normal	Sign test
2 groups	Independent	N ≥ 30		t-test
2 groups	Independent	N < 30	Normally distributed	t-test
2 groups	Independent	N < 30	Not normal	Mann–Whitney U or Wilcoxon rank-sum test
2 groups	Paired	N ≥ 30		paired t-test
2 groups	Paired	N < 30	Normally distributed	paired t-test
2 groups	Paired	N < 30	Not normal	Wilcoxon signed-rank test
3 or more groups	Independent	Normally distributed	1 factor	One way anova
3 or more groups	Independent	Normally distributed	≥ 2 factors	two or other anova
3 or more groups	Independent	Not normal		Kruskal–Wallis one-way analysis of variance by ranks
3 or more groups	Dependent	Normally distributed		Repeated measures anova
3 or more groups	Dependent	Not normal		Friedman two-way analysis of variance by ranks

Nominal measures
1 group		np and n(1-p) ≥ 5	Z-approximation
1 group		np or n(1-p) < 5	binomial
2 groups	Independent	np < 5	fisher exact test or Barnard's test
2 groups	Independent	np ≥ 5	chi-squared test
2 groups	Paired		McNemar or Kappa
3 or more groups	Independent	np < 5	collapse categories for chi-squared test
3 or more groups	Independent	np ≥ 5	chi-squared test
3 or more groups	Dependent		Cochran's Q
