= StatXact =

Statistical software for data analysis

- Developer: Cytel Inc.
- Stable release: 10 / July 10, 2013; 13 years ago
- Written in: C
- Operating system: Windows
- Type: Numerical analysis
- License: Proprietary
- Website: www.cytel.com/software/statxact

StatXact is a statistical software package for analyzing data using exact statistics. It calculates exact p-values and confidence intervals for contingency tables and non-parametric procedures. It is marketed by Cytel Inc.
