= G-test =

Statistical test

In statistics, G-tests are likelihood-ratio or maximum likelihood statistical significance tests that are increasingly being used in situations where chi-squared tests were previously recommended.

== Formulation ==
The general formula for test statistics of the G-test is

$$G = 2\sum_{i} {O_{i} \cdot \ln\left(\frac{O_i}{E_i}\right)},$$

where $O_i \geq 0$ is the observed count in a cell, $E_i > 0$ is the expected count under the null hypothesis, $\ln$ denotes the natural logarithm, and the sum is taken over all non-empty cells. The resulting $G$ is asymptotically chi-squared distributed as the total number of observations tends to infinity (convergence in distribution).

Furthermore, the total observed count must be equal to the total expected count:

$$\sum_i O_i = \sum_i E_i = N,$$

where $N$ is the total number of observations.

Both, the G-test statistics $G$ and the chi-square test statistics $\chi^2$ are special cases of a general family of power divergence statistics by Cressie and Read. For $\lambda\notin\{0,-1\}$ set

$$\operatorname{CR}_\lambda = \frac{2}{\lambda(\lambda+1)}
\sum_i O_i \left( \left( \frac{O_i}{E_i} \right)^\lambda  - 1 \right).$$

Then,

$$G = \lim_{\lambda\to0} \operatorname{CR}_\lambda, \qquad
\chi^2 = \operatorname{CR}_1.$$

=== Derivation ===
We can derive the value of the G-test from the log-likelihood ratio test where the underlying model is a multinomial model.

Suppose we had a sample $O=(O_1,\ldots,O_m)$ where each $O_i$ is the number of times that an object of type $i$ was observed. Furthermore, let $N = \sum_{i=1}^m O_i$ be the total number of observations. If we assume that the underlying model is multinomial, then the test statistic is defined by

$$\ln \left( \frac{L(\tilde p|O)}{L(\hat p|O)} \right)
= \ln \left( \frac{\prod_{i=1}^m \tilde p_i^{O_i}}{\prod_{i=1}^m \hat{p}_i^{O_i}} \right),$$

where $\tilde p=(\tilde p_1,\ldots,\tilde p_m)$ is the null hypothesis and $\hat p=(\hat p_1,\ldots,\hat p_m)$ is the maximum likelihood estimate (MLE) of the parameters given the data. Recall that for the multinomial model, the MLE of $\hat p_i$ given some data is given by

$$\hat p_i = \frac{O_i}{N} \,.$$

Furthermore, we may represent each null hypothesis parameter $\tilde p_i$ as

$$\tilde p_i = \frac{E_i}{N} \,,$$

where $E_i$ is the expected count of objects of type $i$ under the null hypothesis. Thus, by substituting the representations of $\tilde p_i$ and $\hat p_i$ in the log-likelihood ratio, the equation simplifies to

$$\ln \left( \frac{L(\tilde p|O)}{L(\hat p|O)} \right)
= \ln \left( \prod_{i=1}^m \left(\frac{E_i}{O_i}\right)^{O_i} \right)
= \sum_{i=1}^m O_i \ln\left(\frac{E_i}{O_i}\right)$$

Finally, multiply by a factor of $-2$ (used to make the G-test formula asymptotically equivalent to the Pearson's chi-squared test statistics) to achieve the form

$$G
= -2 \sum_{i=1}^m O_i \ln\left(\frac{E_i}{O_i}\right)
= 2 \sum_{i=1}^m O_i \ln\left(\frac{O_i}{E_i}\right)$$

Heuristically, one can imagine $O_i$ as continuous and approaching zero, in which case $O_i \ln O_i \to 0$, and terms with zero observations can simply be dropped. However the expected count in each cell must be strictly greater than zero for each cell ($E_i>0$ for all $i$) to apply the method.

== Distribution and use ==
Given the null hypothesis that the observed frequencies result from random sampling from a distribution with the given expected frequencies, the distribution of the test statistics $G$ is approximately a chi-squared distribution, with the same number of degrees of freedom as in the corresponding chi-squared test.

For very small samples the multinomial test for goodness of fit, and Fisher's exact test for contingency tables, or even Bayesian hypothesis selection are preferable to the G-test. McDonald recommends to always use an exact test (exact test of goodness-of-fit, Fisher's exact test) if the total sample size is less than 1 000 .

There is nothing magical about a sample size of 1 000, it's just a nice round number that is well within the range where an exact test, chi-square test, and G–test will give almost identical p values. Spreadsheets, web-page calculators, and SAS shouldn't have any problem doing an exact test on a sample size of 1 000 .

— John H. McDonald (2014)

G-tests have been recommended at least since the 1981 edition of Biometry, a statistics textbook by Robert R. Sokal and F. James Rohlf.

== Relation to other metrics ==
=== Relation to the chi-squared test ===
The commonly used chi-squared tests for goodness of fit to a distribution and for independence in contingency tables are in fact approximations of the log-likelihood ratio on which the G-tests are based.

The general formula for Pearson's chi-squared test statistic is

$$\chi^2 = \sum_{i} {\frac{\left(O_i - E_i\right)^2}{E_i}}.$$

The approximation of the G-test statistics by chi-squared test statistics is obtained by a second order Taylor expansion of the natural logarithm around 1 (see the derivation below). We have $G \approx \chi^2$ when the observed counts $O_i$ are close to the expected counts $E_i$. When this difference is large, however, the approximation by the chi-squared test statistics begins to break down. Here, the effects of outliers in data will be more pronounced, and this explains the why chi-squared tests fail in situations with little data.

For samples of a reasonable size, the G-test and the chi-squared test will lead to the same conclusions. However, the approximation to the theoretical chi-squared distribution for the G-test is better than for the Pearson's chi-squared test. In cases where $O_i > 2\cdot E_i$ for some cell case the G-test is always better than the chi-squared test.

For testing goodness-of-fit the G-test is infinitely more efficient than the chi-squared test in the sense of Bahadur, but the two tests are equally efficient in the sense of Pitman or in the sense of Hodges and Lehmann.

==== Derivation (chi-squared) ====
Consider

$$G = 2\sum_i {O_i \ln\left(\frac{O_i}{E_i}\right)},$$

and let $O_i = E_i + \delta_i$ with $\textstyle\sum_i \delta_i = 0$, so that the total number of counts remains the same. Assume that $\delta_i=O_i-E_i$ is small in comparison to $E_i$ for all $i$. To be more precise, notice that $E_i = \Theta(n)$ using big Θ notation. If $O_i = E_i + \mathcal{O}(n^{1/2})$ using big O notation for large $n$, which should be true under the null hypothesis because of the central limit theorem, then $\delta_i = \mathcal{O}(n^{1/2})$ and

$$\frac{\delta_i^3}{E_i^2} = \mathcal{O}\left(\frac{n^{3/2}}{n^2}\right) = \mathcal{O}(n^{-1/2})$$

follow, which will be used later.

Upon substitution we find,

$$G = 2\sum_i (E_i + \delta_i) \ln \left(1+\frac{\delta_i}{E_i}\right).$$

Using the Taylor expansion $\ln(1 + x) = x - \tfrac{1}{2}x^2 + \mathcal{O}(x^3)$ yields

$$G = 2\sum_i (E_i + \delta_i) \left(\frac{\delta_i}{E_i} - \frac{1}{2}\frac{\delta_i^2}{E_i^2} + \mathcal{O}\left(\frac{\delta_i^3}{E_i^3}\right) \right),$$

and distributing terms we find,

$$G = 2\sum_i \left( \delta_i + \frac{1}{2}\frac{\delta_i^2}{E_i} + \mathcal{O}\left(\frac{\delta_i^3}{E_i^2}\right) \right).$$

Now, using $\textstyle\sum_i \delta_i = 0$ and $\delta_i = O_i - E_i$ and $\mathcal{O}(\delta_i^3/E_i^2)=\mathcal{O}(n^{-1/2})$ for large $n$, we can write the result,

$$G \approx \sum_{i} \frac{\left(O_i-E_i\right)^2}{E_i}.$$

=== Relation to Kullback–Leibler divergence ===
The G-test statistic is proportional to the Kullback–Leibler divergence of the theoretical distribution $\tilde p=(\tilde p_1,\ldots,\tilde p_m)$ of the null hypothesis from the empirical distribution $\hat p=(\hat p_1,\ldots,\hat p_m)$ of the observed data:

$$\begin{align}
G
&= 2\sum_i {O_i \cdot \ln\left(\frac{O_i}{E_i}\right)}
= 2 N \sum_i {\hat p_i \cdot \ln\left(\frac{\hat p_i}{\tilde p_i}\right)} \\
&= 2 N \, D_{\mathrm{KL}}(\hat p\|\tilde p),
\end{align}$$

where $N$ is the total number of observations and $\tilde p_i = \tfrac{E_i}{N}$ and $\hat p_i = \tfrac{O_i}{N}$ are the theoretical and empirical probabilities of objects of type $i$, respectively.

=== Relation to mutual information ===
For analysis of contingency tables the value of the G-test statistics can also be expressed in terms of mutual information.

In this case objects with two-dimensional types $(i,j)$ are considered. Let $O_{ij}$ be the count of objects of type $(i,j)$, i.e., $O_{ij}$ is the entry in the contingency table in row $i$ and column $j$. Set

$$N = \sum_{ij} O_{ij}, \qquad
\hat p_{ij} = \frac{O_{ij}}{N} \,, \qquad
\hat p_{i \bullet} = \frac{\sum_j O_{ij}}{N} \,, \qquad
\hat p_{\bullet j} = \frac{\sum_i O_{ij}}{N} \,.$$

Then the estimated expected count of objects of type $(i,j)$ assuming independence is given by

$$E_{ij} = N \hat p_{i \bullet} \hat p_{\bullet j}.$$

Finally, the G-test statistics in this case is given by

$$G = 2 \sum_{ij} O_{ij} \ln\left(\frac{O_{ij}}{E_{ij}}\right)$$

Let $X,Y$ be random variables with joint distribution given by the empirical distribution $\hat p_{ij}$ of the contingency table, i.e.,

$$P(X=i, Y=j) = \hat p_{ij}, \qquad
P(X=i) = \hat p_{i \bullet}, \qquad
P(Y=j) = \hat p_{\bullet j}.$$

Then the G-test statistics can be expressed in several alternative forms:

$$\begin{align}
G
&= 2N \cdot \sum_{ij}{\hat p_{ij} \left( \ln(\hat p_{ij})-\ln(\hat p_{i \bullet})-\ln(\hat p_{\bullet j}) \right)} \\
&= 2N \cdot \Bigl( H(X) + H(Y) - H(X,Y) \Bigr) \\
&= 2N \cdot \operatorname{MI}(X,Y),
\end{align}$$

where the entropies $H(X)$ and $H(Y)$ are given

$$H(X) = -\sum_i \hat p_{i \bullet} \ln(\hat p_{i \bullet}), \qquad
H(Y) = -\sum_j \hat p_{\bullet j} \ln(\hat p_{\bullet j})$$

and the joint entropy $H(X,Y)$ is given by

$$H(X,Y) = -\sum_{ij} \hat p_{ij} \ln(\hat p_{ij})$$

and the mutual information of $X$ and $Y$ is

$$\operatorname{MI}(X,Y) = H(X) + H(Y) - H(X,Y).$$

It can also be shown that the inverse document frequency weighting commonly used for text retrieval is an approximation of G applicable when the row sum for the query is much smaller than the row sum for the remainder of the corpus. Similarly, the result of Bayesian inference applied to a choice of single multinomial distribution for all rows of the contingency table taken together versus the more general alternative of a separate multinomial per row produces results very similar to the G-test statistic.

== Application ==
- The McDonald–Kreitman test in statistical genetics is an application of the G-test.
- Dunning introduced the test to the computational linguistics community where it is now widely used.
- The R-scape program (used by Rfam) uses G-test to detect co-variation between RNA sequence alignment positions.

== Statistical software ==
- In R fast implementations can be found in the AMR and Rfast packages. For the AMR package, the command is g.test which works exactly like chisq.test from base R. R also has the likelihood.test function in the Deducer package. Note: Fisher's G-test in the GeneCycle Package of the R programming language (fisher.g.test) does not implement the G-test as described in this article, but rather Fisher's exact test of Gaussian white-noise in a time series.
- Another R implementation to compute the G-test statistic and corresponding p-values is provided by the R package entropy. The commands are Gstat for the standard G statistic and the associated p-value and Gstatindep for the G statistic applied to comparing joint and product distributions to test independence.
- In SAS, one can conduct G-test by applying the /chisq option after the proc freq.
- In Stata, one can conduct a G-test by applying the lr option after the tabulate command.
- In Java, use org.apache.commons.math3.stat.inference.GTest.
- In Python, use scipy.stats.power_divergence with lambda_=0.
