= Cytel =

Contract research organization

- Type: Private
- Industry: Clinical trial services Statistical software Biotechnology
- Founded: 1987
- Headquarters: Cambridge, Massachusetts, United States
- Key people: Jovan Willford (CEO)
- Products: Software and Solutions
- Website: www.cytel.com

Cytel is a multinational statistical software developer and contract research organization, headquartered in Cambridge, Massachusetts, USA. Cytel provides clinical trial design and implementation services, and statistical software products primarily for the biotech and pharmaceutical development markets.

Cytel specializes in adaptive trials – a type of randomized clinical trial that allows modifications of ongoing trials while aiming to preserve the statistical validity and integrity of the study. Based on either frequentist or Bayesian statistics, adaptive trial designs are now widely accepted by government regulatory agencies including the United States Food and Drug Administration (FDA), European Medicines Agency (EMA), and Medicines and Healthcare products Regulatory Agency (MHRA) in early and later stage clinical studies.

As of January 2024, Cytel asserts that its software products and services are used by 30 large biopharmaceutical companies. With a presence spanning North America, Europe, and Asia, the company has a workforce exceeding 2,000 employees.

== Background ==
Company founders Cyrus Mehta, Ph.D. and Nitin Patel, Ph.D. are among the pioneering statisticians credited for developing the underlying statistical methods behind so-called “flexible” designs: group sequential and adaptive trials.

As of 2024, Cytel statisticians have collectively published over 140 papers in peer-reviewed statistical and medical journals.

== Cytel consulting ==
Cytel's consulting arm focuses on optimizing approaches for biopharma clinical research development objectives.

== Clinical research services ==
Cytel's clinical research services arm focuses on improving the probability of success for biopharma clinical research development efforts. Functional elements their clinical research services team claim to provide include:

- Support for DMCs
- Randomization Services
- Clinical Data Management
- Biostatistics
- Statistical Programming
- Medical Writing
- CDISC Migration
- Regulatory Submissions
- Quantitative Pharmacology
- Pharmacometrics
- Data Science
- Complex and Innovative Designs

== Software products ==
East Horizon In 2021, Cytel released Solara, the industry's first-to-market clinical trial strategy platform for simulation-guided clinical study design and selection. In 2024, Cytel expanded the capabilities of Solara by incorporating statistical tests from its Windows-based software East and added the ability to extend its native tests by pulling in custom R functions, and rebranded the product East Horizon.

East East clinical trial statistical software supports the design, simulation and monitoring of adaptive, group sequential and fixed sample size trials. As of 2024, East 6.5 is in use at over 140 pharmaceutical and biotechnology companies, research centers and regulatory agencies including the FDA's Center for Drug Evaluation and Research, Center for Biologics Evaluation and Research and Center for Devices and Radiological Health divisions.

First introduced by the Cytel Software Corporation in 1995 as “East DOS”, the name is derived from the benefit of 'early stopping' a trial due to futility: a failure of the tested treatment to demonstrate significant improvement over an existing treatment and/or placebo.

Enforesys Introduced by Cytel in 2015, Enforesys is a feasibility study decision-making tool for predicting recruitment milestones. Enforesys uses historical study site-level data and simulation models to calculate a numerical probability of success for study enrollment strategies.

Compass Compass is used by biostatisticians and clinicians to plan and design earlier stage adaptive clinical trials (traditionally known as phase 1 human tolerance and phase 2 dose-selection studies).

Compass was the first commercially offered adaptive trial composition software with both frequentist and Bayesian methods. Other key capabilities include R code integration, trial simulation compute engines, plus various tables, charts and graphs to visualize and communicate trial design attributes.

StatXact Statistical software based on the exact branch of statistics used for small-sample categorical and nonparametric data problem-solving. Used by statisticians and researchers in all fields of study, StatXact now has 150 different non-parametric statistical tests and procedures.

Initially offered in 1989 as StatXact DOS, StatXact 12 was released in 2021. The StatXact PROCs variant integrates with the popular SAS statistical software.

LogXact A logistic regression predictive modeling software package suited particularly to cases involving small samples and/or missing data. Logistic regression is used extensively in the medical and social sciences as well as marketing applications to predict subject behavior.

First made available in 1996 under the name LogXact Turbo, LogXact was introduced in 2007 and is currently in its eleventh release. The LogXact PROCs variant integrates with the popular SAS statistical software.

ACES Cytel's web-based Access Controlled Execution System. ACES simplifies compliance with the related FDA guidance and EMA guidelines by a secure means of communicating a clinical trial's interim analysis results and recommendations between the Data Monitoring Committee (DMC/DSMB), Independent Statistical Center and clinical team members. The validated system automatically creates an audit trial, allowing regulators to readily determine "who saw what and when".

OKGO OKGO is the first commercially available software to support the implementation of a quantitative go/no-go decision-making framework in clinical trials.

== See also ==
- Biostatistics
- Clinical research
- Drug development
- Journal of the American Statistical Association
- Randomization
- Sample size determination
