= Optimal discriminant analysis and classification tree analysis =

Optimal Discriminant Analysis (ODA) and the related classification tree analysis (CTA) are exact statistical methods that maximize predictive accuracy. For any specific sample and exploratory or confirmatory hypothesis, optimal discriminant analysis (ODA) identifies the statistical model that yields maximum predictive accuracy, assesses the exact Type I error rate, and evaluates potential cross-generalizability. Optimal discriminant analysis may be applied to > 0 dimensions, with the one-dimensional case being referred to as UniODA and the multidimensional case being referred to as MultiODA. Optimal discriminant analysis is an alternative to ANOVA (analysis of variance) and regression analysis.

== See also ==
- Data mining
- Decision tree
- Factor analysis
- Linear classifier
- Logit (for logistic regression)
- Machine learning
- Multidimensional scaling
- Perceptron
- Preference regression
- Quadratic classifier
- Statistics

== Notes ==
- Yarnold, Paul R.; Soltysik, Robert C. (2004). Optimal Data Analysis. American Psychological Association. ISBN 978-1-55798-981-9. Archived from the original on 2008-11-23.
- Fisher, R. A. (1936). "The Use of Multiple Measurements in Taxonomic Problems". Annals of Eugenics. 7 (2): 179–188. doi:10.1111/j.1469-1809.1936.tb02137.x. hdl:2440/15227.
- Martinez, A. M.; Kak, A. C. (2001). "PCA versus LDA" (PDF). IEEE Transactions on Pattern Analysis and Machine Intelligence. 23 (2): 228–233. doi:10.1109/34.908974.
- Mika, S.; et al. (1999). "Fisher discriminant analysis with kernels". Neural Networks for Signal Processing IX: Proceedings of the 1999 IEEE Signal Processing Society Workshop (Cat. No.98TH8468). pp. 41–48. doi:10.1109/NNSP.1999.788121. ISBN 978-0-7803-5673-3. S2CID 8473401.
