= Sampling distribution =

Probability distribution of the possible sample outcomes

In statistics, a sampling distribution or finite-sample distribution is the probability distribution of a given random-sample-based statistic. For an arbitrarily large number of samples where each sample, involving multiple observations (data points), is separately used to compute one value of a statistic (for example, the sample mean or sample variance) per sample, the sampling distribution is the probability distribution of the values that the statistic takes on. In many contexts, only one sample (i.e., a set of observations) is observed, but the sampling distribution can be found theoretically.

Sampling distributions are important in statistics because they provide a major simplification en route to statistical inference. More specifically, they allow analytical considerations to be based on the probability distribution of a statistic, rather than on the joint probability distribution of all the individual sample values.

== Introduction ==
The sampling distribution of a statistic is the distribution of that statistic, considered as a random variable, when derived from a random sample of size $n$. It may be considered as the distribution of the statistic for all possible samples from the same population of a given sample size. The sampling distribution depends on the underlying distribution of the population, the statistic being considered, the sampling procedure employed, and the sample size used. There is often considerable interest in whether the sampling distribution can be approximated by an asymptotic distribution, which corresponds to the limiting case either as the number of random samples of finite size, taken from an infinite population and used to produce the distribution, tends to infinity, or when just one equally-infinite-size "sample" is taken of that same population.

For example, consider a normal population with mean $\mu$ and variance $\sigma^2$. Assume we repeatedly take samples of a given size from this population and calculate the arithmetic mean $\bar x$ for each sample – this statistic is called the sample mean. The distribution of these means, or averages, is called the "sampling distribution of the sample mean". This distribution is normal $\mathcal{N}(\mu, \sigma^2/n)$ (n is the sample size) since the underlying population is normal, although sampling distributions may be close to normal even when the population distribution is not (see central limit theorem). An alternative to the sample mean is the sample median. When calculated from the same population, it has a different sampling distribution to that of the mean and is generally not normal (but it may be close for large sample sizes).

The mean of a sample from a population having a normal distribution is an example of a simple statistic taken from one of the simplest statistical populations. For other statistics and other populations the formulas are more complicated, and often they do not exist in closed-form. In such cases the sampling distributions may be approximated through Monte-Carlo simulations, bootstrap methods, or asymptotic distribution theory.

== Standard error ==
The standard deviation of the sampling distribution of a statistic is referred to as the standard error of the statistic. For the case where the statistic is the sample mean, and samples are uncorrelated, the standard error is:
$$\sigma_{\bar x} = \frac{\sigma}{\sqrt{n}}$$
where $\sigma$ is the standard deviation of the population distribution of that quantity and $n$ is the sample size (number of items in the sample).

An important implication of this formula is that the sample size must be quadrupled (multiplied by 4) to achieve half (1/2) the measurement error. When designing statistical studies where cost is a factor, this may have a role in understanding cost–benefit tradeoffs.

For the case where the statistic is the sample total, and samples are uncorrelated, the standard error is:
$$\sigma_{\Sigma x} = \sigma\sqrt{n}$$
where, again, $\sigma$ is the standard deviation of the population distribution of that quantity and $n$ is the sample size (number of items in the sample).

== Examples ==
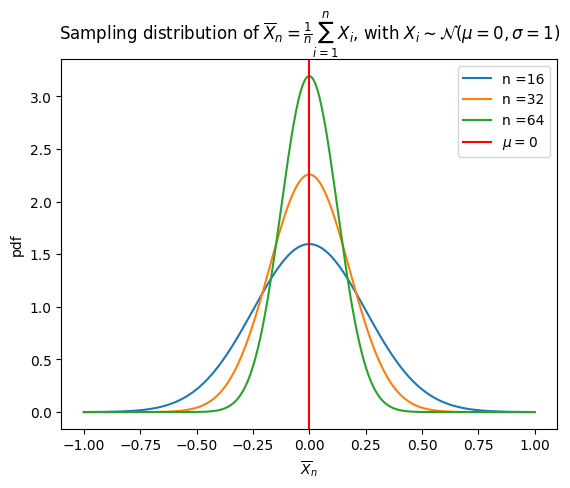
Sampling distribution of the sample mean of normally distributed random numbers. With increasing sample size, the sampling distribution becomes more and more centralized.

Population	Statistic	Sampling distribution
Normal: $\mathcal{N}(\mu, \sigma^2)$	Sample mean $\bar X$ from samples of size n	$\bar X \sim \mathcal{N}\Big(\mu,\, \frac{\sigma^2}{n} \Big)$. If the standard deviation $\sigma$ is not known, one can consider $T = \left(\bar{X} - \mu\right) \frac{\sqrt{n}}{S}$, which follows the Student's t-distribution with $\nu = n - 1$ degrees of freedom. Here $S^2$ is the sample variance, and $T$ is a pivotal quantity, whose distribution does not depend on $\sigma$.
Bernoulli: $\operatorname{Bernoulli}(p)$	Sample proportion of "successful trials" $\bar X$	$n \bar X \sim \operatorname{Binomial}(n, p)$
Two independent normal populations: $\mathcal{N}(\mu_1, \sigma_1^2)$ and $\mathcal{N}(\mu_2, \sigma_2^2)$	Difference between sample means, $\bar X_1 - \bar X_2$	$\bar X_1 - \bar X_2 \sim \mathcal{N}\! \left(\mu_1 - \mu_2,\, \frac{\sigma_1^2}{n_1} + \frac{\sigma_2^2}{n_2} \right)$
Any absolutely continuous distribution F with density f	Median $X_{(k)}$ from a sample of size n = 2k − 1, where sample is ordered $X_{(1)}$ to $X_{(n)}$	$f_{X_{(k)}}(x) = \frac{(2k-1)!}{(k-1)!^2}f(x)\Big(F(x)(1-F(x))\Big)^{k-1}$
Any distribution with distribution function F	Maximum $M=\max\ X_k$ from a random sample of size n	$F_M(x) = P(M\le x) = \prod P(X_k\le x)= \left(F(x)\right)^n$
