= Fisher distribution =

Fisher distribution may refer to any of several probability distributions named after Ronald Fisher:

- Behrens–Fisher distribution
- Fisher's noncentral hypergeometric distribution
- Fisher's z-distribution
- Fisher's fiducial distribution
- Fisher–Bingham distribution
- F-distribution, also called Fisher–Snedecor distribution or Fisher F-distribution
- Fisher–Tippett distribution
- Von Mises–Fisher distribution on a sphere
