= Behrens–Fisher distribution =

Probability distribution

In statistics, the Behrens–Fisher distribution, named after Ronald Fisher and Walter Behrens, is a parameterized family of probability distributions arising from the solution of the Behrens–Fisher problem proposed first by Behrens and several years later by Fisher. The Behrens–Fisher problem is that of statistical inference concerning the difference between the means of two normally distributed populations when the ratio of their variances is not known (and in particular, it is not known that their variances are equal).

== Definition ==
The Behrens–Fisher distribution is the distribution of a random variable of the form

$$T_2 \cos\theta - T_1\sin\theta \,$$

where T_{1} and T_{2} are independent random variables each with a Student's t-distribution, with respective degrees of freedom ν_{1} = n_{1} − 1 and ν_{2} = n_{2} − 1, and θ is a constant. Thus the family of Behrens–Fisher distributions is parametrized by ν_{1}, ν_{2}, and θ.

== Derivation ==
Suppose it were known that the two population variances are equal, and samples of sizes n_{1} and n_{2} are taken from the two populations:

$$\begin{align}
X_{1,1},\ldots,X_{1,n_1} & \sim \operatorname{i.i.d.} N(\mu_1,\sigma^2), \\[6pt]
X_{2,1},\ldots,X_{2,n_2} & \sim \operatorname{i.i.d.} N(\mu_2,\sigma^2).
\end{align}$$

where "i.i.d" are independent and identically distributed random variables and N denotes the normal distribution. The two sample means are

$$\begin{align}
\bar{X}_1 & = (X_{1,1}+\cdots+X_{1,n_1})/n_1 \\[6pt]
\bar{X}_2 & = (X_{2,1}+\cdots+X_{2,n_2})/n_2
\end{align}$$

The usual "pooled" unbiased estimate of the common variance σ^{2} is then

$$S_\mathrm{pooled}^2 = \frac{\sum_{k=1}^{n_1}(X_{1,k}-\bar X_1)^2 + \sum_{k=1}^{n_2}(X_{2,k}-\bar X_2)^2}{n_1+n_2-2} = \frac{(n_1-1)S_1^2 + (n_2-1)S_2^2}{n_1+n_2-2}$$

where S_{1}^{2} and S_{2}^{2} are the usual unbiased (Bessel-corrected) estimates of the two population variances.

Under these assumptions, the pivotal quantity

$$\frac{(\mu_2-\mu_1)-(\bar X_2 - \bar X_1)}{\displaystyle\sqrt{\frac{S^2_\mathrm{pooled}}{n_1} + \frac{S^2_\mathrm{pooled}}{n_2} }}$$

has a t-distribution with n_{1} + n_{2} − 2 degrees of freedom. Accordingly, one can find a confidence interval for μ_{2} − μ_{1} whose endpoints are

$$\bar{X}_2 - \bar{X_1} \pm A \cdot S_\mathrm{pooled} \sqrt{\frac{1}{n_1} +\frac{1}{n_2}},$$

where A is an appropriate quantile of the t-distribution.

However, in the Behrens–Fisher problem, the two population variances are not known to be equal, nor is their ratio known. Fisher considered the pivotal quantity

$$\frac{(\mu_2-\mu_1)-(\bar X_2 - \bar X_1)}{\displaystyle\sqrt{\frac{S^2_1}{n_1} + \frac{S^2_2}{n_2} }}.$$

This can be written as

$$T_2\cos\theta - T_1\sin\theta, \,$$

where

$$T_i = \frac{\mu_i - \bar{X}_i}{S_i/\sqrt{n_i}}\text{ for }i=1,2 \,$$

are the usual one-sample t-statistics and

$$\tan\theta = \frac{S_1/\sqrt{n_1}}{S_2/\sqrt{n_2}}$$

and one takes θ to be in the first quadrant. The algebraic details are as follows:

$$\begin{align}
\frac{(\mu_2-\mu_1)-(\bar X_2 - \bar X_1)}{\displaystyle\sqrt{\frac{S^2_1}{n_1} + \frac{S^2_2}{n_2} }} & = \frac{\mu_2-\bar{X}_2}{\displaystyle\sqrt{\frac{S^2_1}{n_1} + \frac{S^2_2}{n_2} }} - \frac{\mu_1-\bar{X}_1}{\displaystyle\sqrt{\frac{S^2_1}{n_1} + \frac{S^2_2}{n_2} }} \\[10pt]
& = \underbrace{\frac{\mu_2-\bar{X}_2}{S_2/\sqrt{n_2}}}_{\text{This is }T_2} \cdot \underbrace{\left( \frac{S_2/\sqrt{n_2}}{\displaystyle\sqrt{\frac{S^2_1}{n_1} + \frac{S^2_2}{n_2} }} \right)}_{\text{This is }\cos\theta} - \underbrace{\frac{\mu_1-\bar{X}_1}{S_1/\sqrt{n_1}}}_{\text{This is }T_1}\cdot\underbrace{\left( \frac{S_1/\sqrt{n_1}}{\displaystyle\sqrt{\frac{S^2_1}{n_1} + \frac{S^2_2}{n_2} }} \right)}_{\text{This is }\sin\theta}.\qquad\qquad\qquad (1)
\end{align}$$

The fact that the sum of the squares of the expressions in parentheses above is 1 implies that they are the squared cosine and squared sine of some angle.

The Behren–Fisher distribution is actually the conditional distribution of the quantity (1) above, given the values of the quantities labeled cos θ and sin θ. In effect, Fisher conditions on ancillary information.

Fisher then found the "fiducial interval" whose endpoints are

$$\bar{X}_2-\bar{X}_1 \pm A \sqrt{\frac{S_1^2}{n_1} + \frac{S_2^2}{n_2} }$$

where A is the appropriate percentage point of the Behrens–Fisher distribution. Fisher claimed that the probability that μ_{2} − μ_{1} is in this interval, given the data (ultimately the Xs) is the probability that a Behrens–Fisher-distributed random variable is between −A and A.

=== Fiducial intervals versus confidence intervals ===
Bartlett showed that this "fiducial interval" is not a confidence interval because it does not have a constant coverage rate. Fisher did not consider that a cogent objection to the use of the fiducial interval.
