= Walter Behrens =

Walter Behrens may refer to:

- Walter Behrens (footballer) (1929–2005), Argentine-born Chilean footballer
- Walter-Ulrich Behrens (1902–1962), German chemist and statistician
