= Masters M70 high jump world record progression =

This is the progression of world record improvements of the high jump M70 division of Masters athletics.

Key

Incomplete information Pending

Height	Athlete	Nationality	Birthdate	Location	Date
1.59	Carl-Erik Särndal	Sweden	17.07.1937	Värnamo	17.08.2007
1.51	Gordon Seifert	United States	18.07.1928	Murfreesboro	24.06.2000
1.50	Nils Bertil Bevrup	Sweden	29.11.1926	Olofström	11.06.1997
1.48	Ian Hume	Canada	20.08.1914	Etobicoke	08.09.1984
1.47	Winfield McFadden	United States	12.03.1905	Santa Ana	18.06.1977
