= Extensions of Fisher's method =

In statistics, extensions of Fisher's method are a group of approaches that allow approximately valid statistical inferences to be made when the assumptions required for the direct application of Fisher's method are not valid. Fisher's method is a way of combining the information in the p-values from different statistical tests so as to form a single overall test: this method requires that the individual test statistics (or, more immediately, their resulting p-values) should be statistically independent.

== Dependent statistics ==
A principal limitation of Fisher's method is its exclusive design to combine independent p-values, which renders it an unreliable technique to combine dependent p-values. To overcome this limitation, a number of methods were developed to extend its utility.

=== Known covariance ===
==== Brown's method ====
Fisher's method showed that the log-sum of k independent p-values follow a χ^{2}-distribution with 2k degrees of freedom:

$$X = -2\sum_{i=1}^k \log_e(p_i) \sim \chi^2(2k) .$$

In the case that these p-values are not independent, Brown proposed the idea of approximating X using a scaled χ^{2}-distribution, cχ^{2}(k’), with k’ degrees of freedom.

The mean and variance of this scaled χ^{2} variable are:

$$\operatorname{E}[c\chi^2(k')] = ck' ,$$
$$\operatorname{Var}[c\chi^2(k')] = 2c^2k' .$$

where $c=\operatorname{Var}(X)/(2\operatorname{E}[X])$ and $k'=2(\operatorname{E}[X])^2/\operatorname{Var}(X)$. This approximation is shown to be accurate up to two moments.

=== Unknown covariance ===
==== Harmonic mean p-value ====
The harmonic mean p-value offers an alternative to Fisher's method for combining p-values when the dependency structure is unknown but the tests cannot be assumed to be independent.

==== Kost's method: t approximation ====
This method requires the test statistics' covariance structure to be known up to a scalar multiplicative constant.

==== Cauchy combination test ====
This is conceptually similar to Fisher's method: it computes a sum of transformed p-values. Unlike Fisher's method, which uses a log transformation to obtain a test statistic which has a chi-squared distribution under the null, the Cauchy combination test uses a tan transformation to obtain a test statistic whose tail is asymptotic to that of a Cauchy distribution under the null. The test statistic is:

$$X = \sum_{i=1}^k \omega_i \tan[(0.5-p_i)\pi] ,$$

where $\omega_i$ are non-negative weights, subject to $\sum_{i=1}^k \omega_i = 1$. Under the null, $p_i$ are uniformly distributed, therefore $\tan[(0.5-p_i)\pi]$ are Cauchy distributed. Under some mild assumptions, but allowing for arbitrary dependency between the $p_i$, the tail of the distribution of X is asymptotic to that of a Cauchy distribution. More precisely, letting W denote a standard Cauchy random variable:

$$\lim_{t \to \infty} \frac{P[X > t]}{P[W > t]} = 1.$$

This leads to a combined hypothesis test, in which X is compared to the quantiles of the Cauchy distribution.
