= Adaptive estimator =

Estimator in statistics

In statistics, an adaptive estimator is an estimator in a parametric or semiparametric model with nuisance parameters such that the presence of these nuisance parameters does not affect efficiency of estimation.

== Definition ==
Formally, let parameter θ in a parametric model consists of two parts: the parameter of interest ν ∈ N ⊆ R^{k}, and the nuisance parameter η ∈ H ⊆ R^{m}. Thus θ = (ν,η) ∈ N×H ⊆ R^{k+m}. Then we will say that $\scriptstyle\hat\nu_n$ is an adaptive estimator of ν in the presence of η if this estimator is regular, and efficient for each of the submodels

$$\mathcal{P}_\nu(\eta_0) = \big\{ P_\theta: \nu\in N,\, \eta=\eta_0\big\}.$$

Adaptive estimator estimates the parameter of interest equally well regardless whether the value of the nuisance parameter is known or not.

The necessary condition for a regular parametric model to have an adaptive estimator is that

$$I_{\nu\eta}(\theta) = \operatorname{E}[\, z_\nu z_\eta' \,] = 0 \quad \text{for all }\theta,$$

where z_{ν} and z_{η} are components of the score function corresponding to parameters ν and η respectively, and thus I_{νη} is the top-right k×m block of the Fisher information matrix I(θ).

== Example ==
Suppose $\scriptstyle\mathcal{P}$ is the normal location-scale family:

$$\mathcal{P} = \Big\{\ f_\theta(x) = \tfrac{1}{\sqrt{2\pi}\sigma} e^{ -\frac{1}{2\sigma^2}(x-\mu)^2 }\ \Big|\ \mu\in\mathbb{R}, \sigma>0 \ \Big\}.$$

Then the usual estimator $\hat\mu\,=\,\bar{x}$ is adaptive: we can estimate the mean equally well whether we know the variance or not.

== Basic references ==
- Bickel, Peter J.; Chris A.J. Klaassen; Ya’acov Ritov; Jon A. Wellner (1998). Efficient and adaptive estimation for semiparametric models. Springer: New York. ISBN 978-0-387-98473-5.

== Other useful references ==
- I. V. Blagouchine and E. Moreau: "Unbiased Adaptive Estimations of the Fourth-Order Cumulant for Real Random Zero-Mean Signal", IEEE Transactions on Signal Processing, vol. 57, no. 9, pp. 3330–3346, September 2009.
