= Frank J. Massey =

American mathematician and statistician (1919–1995)

Frank J. Massey Jr. (November 22, 1919 – November 18, 1995) was an American mathematician and statistician. He is known for developing the biostatistics program at the UCLA Fielding School of Public Health and for a classic text: Introduction to Statistical Analysis, co-authored with Wilfrid Dixon.

== Early life and education ==
Massey was born in Portsmouth, New Hampshire; his family moved to California when he was a teenager. He earned both his A.B. (mathematics, 1941) and his Ph.D. (mathematical statistics, 1947) from the University of California, Berkeley. His Ph.D. thesis was Estimation of a Distribution Function by Confidence Limits, under the tutelage of Jerzy Neyman.

== Career ==
After completing his Ph.D., Massey joined the faculty at the University of Maryland, College Park before moving to the University of Oregon where he and Dixon developed the mathematical statistics graduate curriculum. Lacking a suitable textbook they wrote their own: Introduction to Statistical Analysis. Re-issued in three subsequent editions and translated into a number of languages, it became widely used throughout the US and overseas. In 1955 or 1956, (Note: Sources are divided on the date Massey moved to UCLA.) Massey followed Dixon to the University of California, Los Angeles, where they developed the statistics department in the nascent School of Public Health. Massey became the first associate dean of the School of Public Health and headed the Division of Biostatistics. In 1966, Massey was elected fellow of the American Statistical Association. He retired from UCLA in 1990, after more than 35 years on faculty there.

== Personal life ==
Massey died on November 18, 1995, aged 75.
