= Neyman–Scott process =

Model describing formation of point patterns

The Neyman–Scott process is a stochastic model used to describe the formation of clustered point patterns. Originally developed for modeling galaxy distributions by Jerzy Neyman and Elizabeth L. Scott in 1952, it provides a framework for understanding phenomena characterized by clustering. It is applied across diverse fields like astronomy, epidemiology, ecology, and materials science, particularly where events occur in groups rather than independently.

The process unfolds in two stages. First, a "parent" point process, often a Poisson process, generates a set of parent points (cluster centers). These parent points are typically latent, meaning they are not directly observable. Second, each parent point independently generates a random number of "offspring" points. The number of offspring from each parent is determined by a probability distribution, such as the Poisson distribution. These offspring points are the observable elements of the Neyman–Scott process. The spatial distribution of offspring relative to their parent is also governed by a probability distribution, commonly a Gaussian or uniform distribution.
