= Neyman allocation =

Method of sample size allocation

Neyman allocation, also known as optimum allocation, is a method of sample size allocation in stratified sampling developed by Jerzy Neyman in 1934. This technique determines the optimal sample size for each stratum to minimize the variance of the estimated population parameter for a fixed total sample size and cost.

== Theory ==
In stratified sampling, the population is divided into L mutually exclusive and exhaustive strata, and independent samples are drawn from each stratum. Neyman allocation determines the sample size n_{h} for each stratum h that minimizes the variance of the estimated population mean or total. The Neyman allocation formula is:

$$n_h = n \times \frac{N_h \times S_h}{\sum(N_h \times S_h)}$$

where:

- n_{h} is the sample size for stratum h
- n is the total sample size
- N_{h} is the population size for stratum h
- S_{h} is the standard deviation of the variable of interest in stratum h
- Σ represents the sum over all strata

== Mathematical derivation ==
The derivation of Neyman allocation follows from minimizing the variance of the stratified mean estimator subject to a fixed total sample size constraint. The variance of the stratified mean estimator is:

$$\operatorname{Var}(\bar{y}_{st}) = \sum\frac{N_h^2}{n_h} \times \frac{1-f_h}{N^2} \times S_h^2$$

where f_{h} = n_{h}/N_{h} is the sampling fraction in stratum h. Using the method of Lagrange multipliers to minimize this variance subject to the constraint Σn_{h} = n leads to the Neyman allocation formula.

== Advantages ==
Neyman allocation offers several advantages over other allocation methods:

- It provides the most statistically efficient allocation for estimating population means and totals when costs are equal across strata.
- It takes into account both the size and variability of each stratum.
- It generally results in smaller standard errors compared to proportional allocation.

== Limitations ==
Despite its optimality properties, Neyman allocation has some practical limitations:

- It requires prior knowledge of stratum standard deviations, which may not be available in practice.
- The allocated sample sizes may not be integers and need to be rounded.
- Very small strata may receive insufficient sample sizes for reliable estimation.
- It may not be optimal when estimating multiple parameters simultaneously.

== Applications ==
Neyman allocation is widely used in large-scale surveys and statistical studies, particularly in:

- Official statistics and government surveys
- Market research studies
- Environmental sampling
- Quality control in manufacturing
- Educational assessment studies

When sampling costs differ across strata, the allocation can be modified to account for these differences, leading to cost-optimal allocation formulas.

== See also ==
- Stratified sampling
- Optimal design
- Survey sampling
- Jerzy Neyman
