= Carl-Erik Särndal =

Swedish statistician

Carl-Erik Särndal (born 1937) is a Swedish-Canadian statistician. specializing in survey statistics. He held professorial appointments at Umeå University; University of British Columbia, Université de Montréal, and Statistics Sweden, Stockholm. He specialized in survey theory and methodology, especially with applications to official statistics production for a country. He worked, periodically, as researcher, expert and/or consultant, at national statistical agencies: Statistics Canada (Ottawa), Statistics Sweden (Stockholm) and Statistics Finland (Helsinki).

== Education and professional years ==
Carl-Erik Särndal grew up in Sweden. He attended Lund University, where he earned a Bachelor of Science degree in 1957, and a PhD in statistics in 1962. He was a professor at the Department of Statistics, Umeå University, Sweden, 1967–1970; Division of Management Science, Faculty of Commerce & Business Administration, University of British Columbia, Vancouver, 1970–1980; Département de mathématiques et de statistique, Université de Montréal, 1980–1997; Statistics Sweden, 1997–2002.

== Research ==
Model assisted design-based inference; uses of auxiliary information in estimation; generalized regression (GREG) estimation; calibration weighting, in particular for survey nonresponse; critical examination of the probability sampling paradigm.

== Honours and awards ==
- Fellow, American Statistical Association, 1973.
- Honorary member, Finnish Statistical Society, 1995.
- Honorary doctor's degree (filosofie hedersdoktor), Örebro University, Sweden, 2000.
- Honorary Member, Statistical Society of Canada, 2002.
- Waksberg Award, by American Statistical Association and Statistics Canada, to prominent survey methodology statistician, 2007.
- Jerzy Neyman Medal, Polish Statistical Association, 2018.
- Honorary doctor's degree, Université de Neuchâtel, Switzerland, 2022.

== Select bibliography ==
=== Books ===
- C.M. Cassel, C.E. Särndal, J. Wretman (1977), Foundations of Inference in Survey Sampling. New York: Wiley, 192 pp.
- C.E. Särndal, B. Swensson, J. Wretman (1992), Model Assisted Survey Sampling. New York: Springer-Verlag, 695 pp, in paperback 2003.
- C.E. Särndal, S. Lundström (2005), Estimation in Surveys with Nonresponse. New York: Wiley, 212 pp.

=== Selected articles ===
- C.M. Cassel, C.E. Särndal and J.H. Wretman (1976), Some results on generalized difference estimation and generalized regression estimation for finite populations. Biometrika, 63, 615- 620.
- J.C. Deville, C.E. Särndal (1992), Calibration estimators in survey sampling. Journal of the American Statistical Association, 87, 376–382.
- C.E. Särndal (2007). The calibration approach in survey theory and practice. Survey Methodology Journal, 33(2), 99–119.

=== Further reading ===
- R. Platek and C.E. Särndal (2001). Can a statistician deliver? Journal of Official Statistics, 17(1), 1–127, with discussions and rejoinder.
- P.S. Kott (2005). An interview with the authors of Model Assisted Survey Sampling. Journal of Official Statistics, 21(2), 171–182.
- D. Devaud and Y. Tillé (2019). Deville and Särndal's calibration: revisiting a 25-year-old successful optimization problem, TEST, 28(4), 1033–1091, with discussions and rejoinder.
