= Jerzy Neyman =

Polish American mathematician (1894–1981)

Jerzy Spława-Neyman
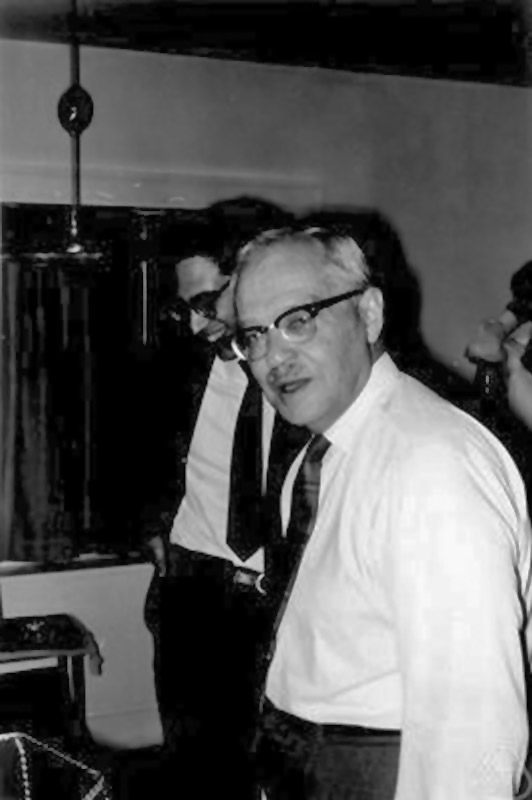
- Neyman in 1969
- Born: Jerzy Spława-Neyman; April 16, 1894; Bendery, Bessarabia Governorate, Russian Empire (now Bender, Moldova)
- Died: August 5, 1981 (aged 87); Oakland, California, US
- Education: University of Warsaw; Kharkov University
- Known for: Neyman construction; Neyman allocation; Neyman–Pearson lemma; Neyman Type A distribution; Neyman–Scott process; Neyman–Rubin causal model; Fisher–Neyman factorization theorem; Neyman-Pearson operational criteria; Confidence interval; Hypothesis testing; Statistics of galaxy clusters
- Awards: Newcomb Cleveland Prize (1958); Guy Medal (Gold, 1966); National Medal of Science (1968); Fellow of the Royal Society
- Scientific career
- Fields: Mathematics
- Workplaces: Nencki Institute of Experimental Biology; University College London; University of California, Berkeley
- Thesis: Justification of Applications of Calculus of Probability to the Solution of Certain Questions of Agricultural Experimentation (1924)
- Doctoral advisor: Wacław Sierpiński
- Doctoral students: George Dantzig; Lucien Le Cam; Evelyn Fix; Erich Leo Lehmann; Joseph Hodges; Pao-Lu Hsu; Frank J. Massey

Jerzy Spława-Neyman (also known as Jerzy Neyman; pronounced [ˈjɛʐɨ ˈspwava ˈnɛjman]; April 16, 1894 – August 5, 1981) was a Polish mathematician and statistician. He made major contributions to the development of modern statistical theory. Neyman introduced the modern concept of a confidence interval into statistical hypothesis testing and, with Egon Pearson, revised Ronald Fisher's null hypothesis testing. Neyman allocation, an optimal strategy for choosing sample sizes in stratified sampling, is named for him.

He spent the first part of his professional career at various institutions in Warsaw, Poland, and then at University College London, and the second part at the University of California, Berkeley where he founded and developed one of the world’s leading centres of mathematical statistics.

Neyman was the recipient of many awards during his career including the Guy Medal, the Newcomb Cleveland Prize, and the National Medal of Science. He was a member of the Polish Academy of Sciences, the Polish Mathematical Society, the National Academy of Sciences, and Fellow of the Royal Society.

== Life and career ==
=== Early life and education ===
Neyman was born on 16 April 1894 into a Polish family in Bendery, in the Bessarabia Governorate of the Russian Empire (present-day Bender, Moldova), the fourth of four children of Czesław Spława-Neyman, a lawyer, and Kazimiera (née Lutosławska). His family was Roman Catholic and descended from a long line of Polish nobles and military heroes. Neyman served as an altar boy during his early childhood, though he would become an agnostic in later life. By the time he was 10, he could speak five languages: Polish, Ukrainian, Russian, French and German.

He graduated from the Kamieniec Podolski gubernial gymnasium for boys in 1909 under the name Yuri Cheslavovich Neyman. Neyman's father died of heart attack when he was 12 and his family subsequently relocated to Kharkiv. He began studies at Kharkiv University in 1912, where he was taught by Ukrainian probabilist Sergei Natanovich Bernstein, who exerted an enduring influence on him. Neyman was not drafted into the army following the outbreak of World War I due to poor eyesight, which enabled him to stay at the university and continue his education.

After having read Lessons on the integration and the research of the primitive functions by Henri Lebesgue, he was fascinated with measure theory and integration. In 1915, he completed a paper on Lebesgue integration for which he was awarded Gold Medal. In 1917–21, he worked as an assistant of Antoni Przeborski at the Technological Institute in Kharkiv.

In the period of the Russian Revolution, Neyman's health began to deteriorate. Doctors diagnosed tuberculosis, advising him to travel south to recuperate. In 1919, he went to the Crimea, where he met a Russian woman, Olga Solodovnikova, who was a painter. Soon after he returned to Kharkov to begin teaching in the autumn of that year, Olga also came back, and their friendship eventually led to their marriage in 1920.

=== Professional career ===
In 1921, Neyman returned to Poland in a program of repatriation of POWs after the Polish-Soviet War. He briefly worked at the Institute of Agricultural Reseach in Bydgoszcz. His first scientific paper Sur un théorème métrique, concernant les ensembles fermés was published in 1923 in Fundamenta Mathematicae. During his student years, Neyman devoted much of his limited free time to teaching mathematics and statistics, including to college students, in order to support himself. In 1924, he earned his doctorate at University of Warsaw for a dissertation titled Justification of Applications of Calculus of Probability to the Solution of Certain Questions of Agricultural Experimentation written under the supervision of Wacław Sierpiński..

After having been granted the Fund for National Culture and Rockefeller Foundation scholarships, in 1924–26, he stayed in London, where he collaborated with Karl Pearson, his son Egon, and Ronald Fisher and in Paris, where he attended lectures by Henri Lebesgue and Émile Borel, and a seminar by Jacques Hadamard at the Collège de France.

His work with Egon Pearson proved especially fruitful as the two authored six joint papers between 1926–34 including "On the Problem of Two Samples" published by the Polish Academy of Sciences (1930) and "On the Problem of the Most Efficient Tests of Statistical Hypotheses" (1933), which contained the Neyman-Pearson lemma.

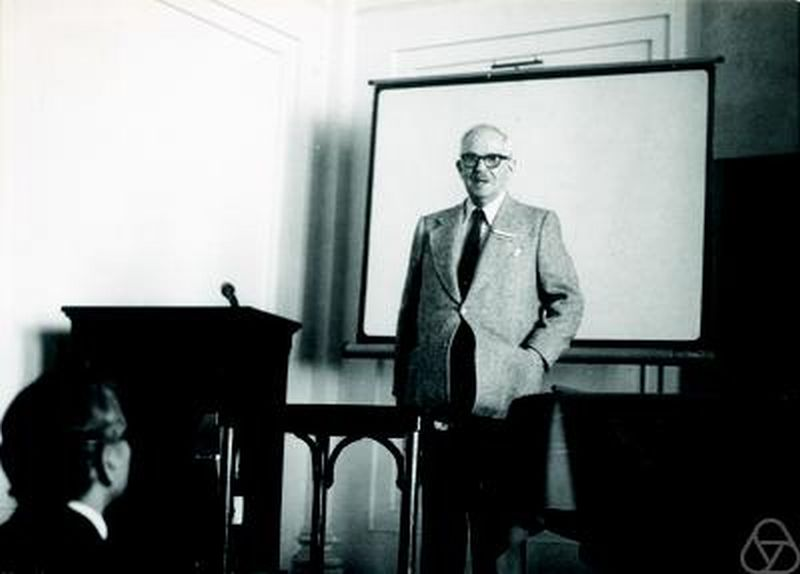
Neyman in Warsaw, 1973

After his return to Poland, he established the Biometric Laboratory at the Nencki Institute of Experimental Biology in Warsaw. In 1923–34, he served as director of the Statistical Laboratory of the Warsaw University of Life Sciences (SGGW). In 1928, Neyman obtained habilitation at the SGGW. In 1934, at Egon Pearson’s invitation, he travelled to Britain, where he lectured at University College London. During his tenure at University College, Neyman wrote a paper on stratified sampling that helped establish the methodological basis for what became the Gallup Poll.

Neyman proposed and studied randomized experiments in 1923. His paper "On the Two Different Aspects of the Representative Method: The Method of Stratified Sampling and the Method of Purposive Selection", given at the Royal Statistical Society on 19 June 1934, was the groundbreaking event leading to modern scientific sampling. He introduced the confidence interval in his paper in 1937.

He was an Invited Speaker of the International Congress of Mathematicians (ICM) in 1928 in Bologna and a Plenary Speaker of the ICM in 1954 in Amsterdam. In 1929, at the 18th session of the International Statistical Institute held in Warsaw, Neyman delivered a talk entitled "A Contribution to the Theory of the Credibility of Statistical Hypotheses."

In 1937, he visited the United States and spent six weeks giving lectures at a number of universities, including the Graduate School in the U.S. Department of Agriculture in Washington, in which he spoke about the importance of probability theory to statistics, developing his theories and presenting his research findings to support it. Based on these lectures, Neyman published a book in 1938 entitled Lectures and Conferences on Mathematical Statistics. He also published books dealing with experiments and statistics, and devised the way which the Food and Drug Administration tests medicines today.

=== Move to the United States ===
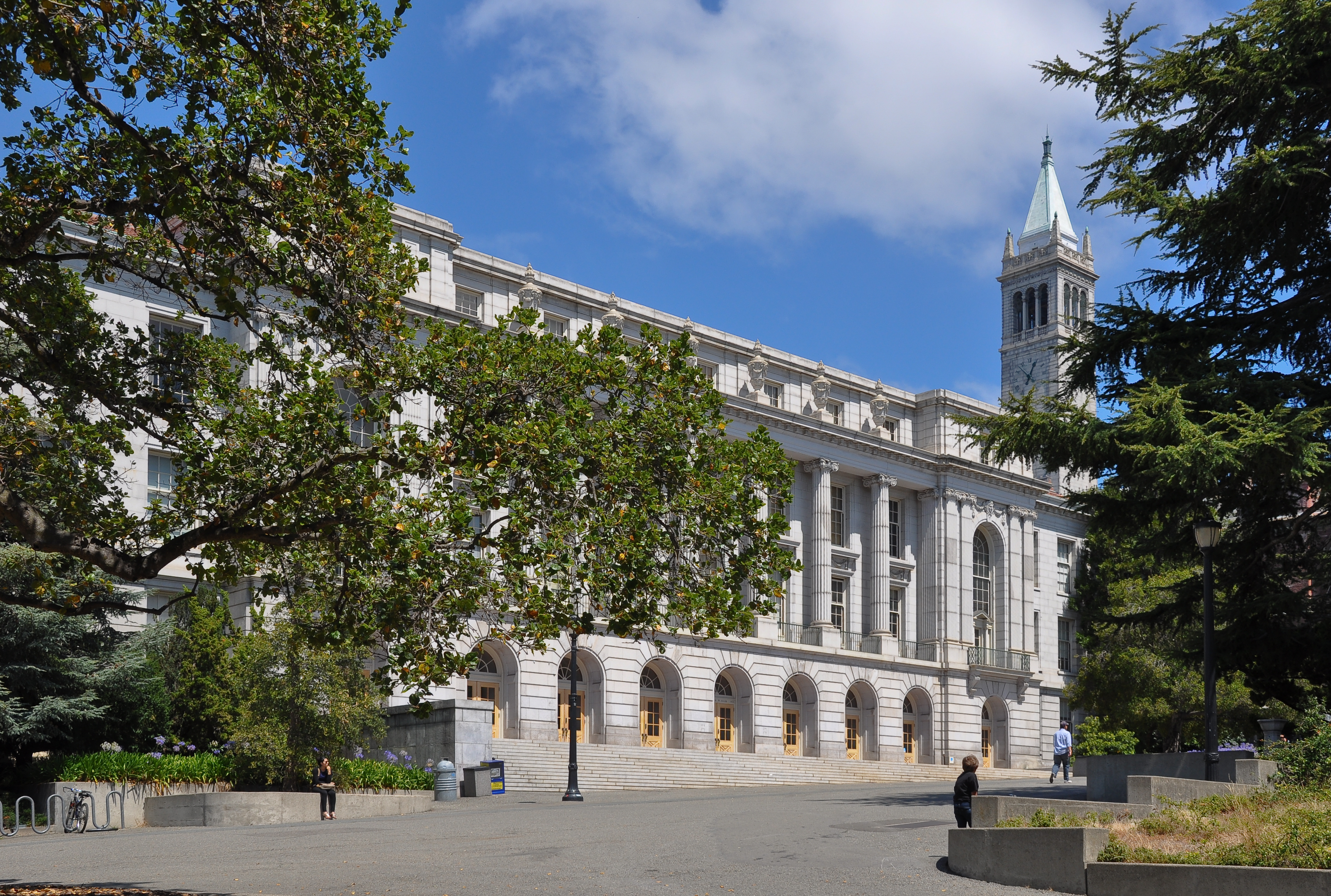
Neyman spent his academic career in the United States at the University of California, Berkeley.

In 1938, Neyman moved to Berkeley, where he worked for the rest of his life at the University of California, Berkeley. After the outbreak of World War II, he briefly turned to military research focusing in particular on bomb‑sight design and targeting problems. During his time at Berkeley, he sought to establish a world‑class centre for mathematical statistics at this institution, working relentlessly toward this aim advancing concepts in estimation and hypothesis‑testing theory. He established there the Statistical Laboratory, a scientific center which worked for many institutions including the U.S. government. His efforts culminated in the creation of a separate statistics department at the university on 1 July 1955.

Throughout his academic career, 45 students obtained their PhD degrees under his advisorship including George Dantzig, Lucien Le Cam, Evelyn Fix, Erich Leo Lehmann, Joseph Hodges, Pao-Lu Hsu, and Frank J. Massey.

=== Recognition and death ===
Neyman was a recipient of many prestigious awards for his contributions to science. In 1958, he was awarded the Newcomb Cleveland Prize of the American Association for the Advancement of Science (AAAS). In 1966, he received the Guy Medal of the Royal Statistical Society and, three years later, he accepted the U.S. National Medal of Science, the highest science award in the United States, from President Lyndon B. Johnson "for laying the foundations of modern statistics and devising tests and procedure that have become essential parts of the knowledge of every statistician." He died in Oakland, California, in 1981.

== Contributions ==
Neyman’s scholarly output comprises more than 240 publications, covering an exceptionally broad range of topics – from pure mathematical statistics, the theory of stochastic processes, and sampling theory to applications in agriculture, epidemiology, meteorology, genetics, biology, medical diagnosis, social insurance, and astronomy.

Neyman played a central role in shaping modern hypothesis testing. In 1933, together with Egon Pearson, he introduced the concept in statistics known as the Neyman-Pearson lemma, which asserts the existence and uniqueness of the likelihood ratio as a uniformly most powerful test in specified settings. It forms a central component of the broader Neyman–Pearson theory for statistical testing, which also developed key notions such as Type II error, power function, and inductive behavior.

A key part of Neyman's collaboration with Pearson was a systematic revision of Ronald Fisher’s formulation of the null hypothesis. Fisher had emphasized significance testing as a measure of evidence against a null model, but Neyman and Pearson reframed the problem: instead of treating the null as something to be “rejected” or “not rejected,” they defined hypothesis testing as a decision procedure with controlled long‑run error probabilities.

Another significant contribution by Neyman was introduced in 1934, and is now known as the Neyman allocation. It is a stratified‑sampling method which specifies the optimal sample size for each stratum so as to minimize the variance of an estimated population parameter given a fixed overall sample size and cost.

In 1937, Neyman developed the concept of the confidence interval into a general framework for statistical hypothesis tests. In frequentist statistics, it denotes a range of values that, under repeated sampling, is expected to contain the true value of an unknown parameter, for example, a population mean. Other notalbe concepts named after Neyman include the Neyman construction, Neyman Type A distribution, Neyman–Scott process, the Neyman-Rubin causal model, and the Fisher–Neyman factorization theorem.

== Awards and distinctions ==
- Member of the Polish Mathematical Society (1923)
- Member of the Polish Statistical Association (1931)
- President of the Institute of Mathematical Statistics (1949)
- Plenary Speaker at the International Congress of Mathematicians in Amsterdam (1954)
- Newcomb Cleveland Prize (1958)
- Member of the National Academy of Sciences (1963)
- Member of the Polish Academy of Sciences (1966)
- Guy Medal of the Royal Statistical Society (1966)
- Wilks Memorial Award of the American Statistical Association (1968)
- National Medal of Science (1968)
- Member of the Royal Swedish Academy (1973)
- Honorary degree of the University of Warsaw (1974)
- Fellow of the Royal Society (1979)

== See also ==
- List of Polish mathematicians
