= Coverage probability =

Concept in statistical estimation theory

In statistical estimation theory, the coverage probability, or coverage for short, is the probability that a confidence interval or confidence region will include the true value (parameter) of interest. It can be defined as the proportion of instances where the interval surrounds the true value as assessed by long-run frequency.

In statistical prediction, the coverage probability is the probability that a prediction interval will include an out-of-sample value of the random variable. The coverage probability can be defined as the proportion of instances where the interval surrounds an out-of-sample value as assessed by long-run frequency.

== Concept ==
The fixed degree of certainty pre-specified by the analyst, referred to as the confidence level or confidence coefficient of the constructed interval, is effectively the nominal coverage probability of the procedure for constructing confidence intervals. Hence, referring to a "nominal confidence level" or "nominal confidence coefficient" (e.g., as a synonym for nominal coverage probability) generally has to be considered tautological and misleading, as the notion of confidence level itself inherently implies nominality already. (Note: However, some textbooks use the terms nominal confidence level or nominal confidence coefficient, and actual confidence level or actual confidence coefficient in the sense of "nominal" and "actual coverage probability"; cf., for instance, Wackerly, Dennis; Mendenhall, William; Schaeffer, Richard L. (2008), Mathematical Statistics with Applications (7th ed.), Cengage Learning, p. 437, ISBN 978-1-111-79878-9.) The nominal coverage probability is often set at 0.95. By contrast, the (true) coverage probability is the actual probability that the interval contains the parameter.

If all assumptions used in deriving a confidence interval are met, the nominal coverage probability will equal the coverage probability (termed "true" or "actual" coverage probability for emphasis). If any assumptions are not met, the actual coverage probability could either be less than or greater than the nominal coverage probability. When the actual coverage probability is greater than the nominal coverage probability, the interval is termed a conservative (confidence) interval; if it is less than the nominal coverage probability, the interval is termed anti-conservative, or permissive. For example, suppose the interest is in the mean number of months that people with a particular type of cancer remain in remission following successful treatment with chemotherapy. The confidence interval aims to contain the unknown mean remission duration with a given probability. In this example, the coverage probability would be the real probability that the interval actually contains the true mean remission duration.

A discrepancy between the coverage probability and the nominal coverage probability frequently occurs when approximating a discrete distribution with a continuous one. The construction of binomial confidence intervals is a classic example where coverage probabilities rarely equal nominal levels. For the binomial case, several techniques for constructing intervals have been created. The Wilson score interval is one well-known construction based on the normal distribution. Other constructions include the Wald, exact, Agresti-Coull, and likelihood intervals. While the Wilson score interval may not be the most conservative estimate, it produces average coverage probabilities that are equal to nominal levels while still producing a comparatively narrow confidence interval.

The "probability" in coverage probability is interpreted with respect to a set of hypothetical repetitions of the entire data collection and analysis procedure. In these hypothetical repetitions, independent data sets following the same probability distribution as the actual data are considered, and a confidence interval is computed from each of these data sets; see Neyman construction. The coverage probability is the fraction of these computed confidence intervals that include the desired but unobservable parameter value.

== Probability Matching ==
In estimation, when the coverage probability is equal to the nominal coverage probability, that is known as probability matching.

In prediction, when the coverage probability is equal to the nominal coverage probability, that is known as predictive probability matching.

== Formula ==
The construction of the confidence interval ensures that the probability of finding the true parameter $\vartheta$ in the sample-dependent interval $(T_u, T_v)$ is (at least) $\gamma$:

$$P\left(T_{u} \leq \vartheta \leq T_{v}\right)\geq\gamma \quad (\text{for any allowed parameter } \vartheta)$$

== See also ==
- Binomial proportion confidence interval
- Confidence distribution
- False coverage rate
- Interval estimation
