= Walter-Ulrich Behrens =

German chemist and statistician (1902–1962)

Walter-Ulrich Behrens (1902 – 24 August 1962) was a German chemist and statistician who co-discovered with Ronald Fisher the Behrens-Fisher problem and the associated Behrens-Fisher distribution.

Born in Leipzig, Behrens studied natural sciences and chemistry at Leipzig University, and graduated with a doctorate in 1924. After a short period at the university's Institute of Physical Chemistry, he worked for several years at the Agricultural Experimental Station in Leipzig-Mockern. In 1927 he joined the Institute for Agriculture and Plant Breeding of the University of Königsberg as a scientific assistant and in 1932 became scientific chief assistant at the Institute of Agricultural Chemistry and Bacteriology (later the Institute for Plant Nutrition and Soil Biology).

After having his application for habilitation blocked on political grounds in the early 1930s, he was forced to leave academia and became scientific director at the agricultural experimental station of the German agricultural chemicals company Kali Chemie, based in Hanover. He worked there from May 1935 until his death. Meanwhile he was sent as Soldier to Russia in the Second World War. After his war captivity he returned to Hanover, where his wife Grita and his three children Ralf, Reiner and Uta lived.

From the late 1920s onwards he also contributed to the theory of non-parametric statistics, and developed methods for cases involving single and two samples. In 1933 Behrens published Mathematische Methoden fur Versuchsansteller ('Mathematical Methods for Experimenters').
