= Polish Statistical Association =

The Polish Statistical Association (Polish: Polskie Towarzystwo Statystyczne, PTS) was established in Kraków in 1912. It is one of the oldest statistical associations in the world. Its first president, Juliusz Leo, was Professor of the Jagiellonian University and the President of Kraków. The main aim of PTS in the period before World War I was to prepare a statistical overview of the Polish lands from the most distant past until modern times. The work was published in Kraków in 1915 and was entitled "The Statistics of Poland".

== History ==
The activity of PTS was suspended during World War I. In 1917, a similar organisation was established in Warsaw, called the Association of Polish Economists and Statisticians (TEiSP). A Statistics section was created within TEiSP, which was directed by Professor Ludwik Krzywicki. In 1937 the Statistics Section of TEiSP was transformed into a separate organisation, the Polish Statistical Association, with Professor Edward Szturm de Sztrem, the then President of the Central Statistical Office, acting as its president. PTS published its official journal, a quarterly entitled "Statistical Review". In 1939 PTS had 290 real members and about 30 so-called supporting from various institutions.

Following the outbreak of World War II the activity of PTS was suspended until April 1947, when Professor Stefan Szulc became its new president and the publication of "Statistical Review" was resumed.

After 1950 the activity of PTS dwindled, leading to a decision in 1953 to close it down, which was put into effect in 1955. Some members of PTS moved to the Polish Economic Society, where a Statistics section was created.

== Reactivation ==
The Association was reactivated in April 1981. The General Assembly appointed a Temporary Main Council with Professor Mikołaj Latuch as its president. In the following terms the office of the President was held by Professor Jan Kordos (1985–1990 and 1990–1994), dr Kazimierz Kruszka (2005–2010) and Professor Czesław Domański (1994–2000, 2000–2005 and again since 2010). In 1987 the Statistical Research & Analysis Bureau (BBiAS) of the Main Council of PTS was established. At present there are three sections within the Polish Statistical Association: the Historical Section, Classification and Data Analysis Section and the Mathematical Statistics Section. From 1985 to 1994 the Association spread developing a network of regional branches with about 800 members in all. 1993 saw the launch of an international journal published by PTS entitled "Statistics in Transition". In addition, the Polish Statistical Association co-edits with the Central Statistical Office the monthly journal "Wiadomości Statystyczne".

At present the Polish Statistical Association has about 750 members, organized in 17 regional branches. Since 1994 PTS has been an affiliated member of International Statistical Institute. In 2008 by virtue of a joint decision of the Main Council of PTS, The Committee on Statistics and Econometrics of the Polish Academy of Sciences and the President of the Central Statistical Office, 9 March was declared to be the Day of Polish Statistics. The day commemorates the anniversary of the first Census decreed by the Great Sejm on March 9, 1798.

== Centenary ==
The celebration of the 100th anniversary of the Polish Statistical Association was inaugurated by a historic event: the Congress of Polish Statistics, which was held in Poznań between 18 and 20 April 2012. It was a unique event with international participation, under the honorary patronage of the President of the Republic of Poland, Bronisław Komorowski.
