= Pivotal quantity =

Function of observations and unobservable parameters

In statistics, a pivotal quantity or pivot is a function of observations and unobservable parameters such that the function's probability distribution does not depend on the unknown parameters (including nuisance parameters). A pivot need not be a statistic — the function and its value can depend on the parameters of the model, but its distribution must not. If it is a statistic, then it is known as an ancillary statistic.

More formally, let $X = (X_1,X_2,\ldots,X_n)$ be a random sample from a distribution that depends on a parameter (or vector of parameters) $\theta$. Let $g(X,\theta)$ be a random variable whose distribution is the same for all $\theta$. Then $g$ is called a pivotal quantity (or simply a pivot).

Pivotal quantities are commonly used for normalization to allow data from different data sets to be compared. It is relatively easy to construct pivots for location and scale parameters: for the former we form differences so that location cancels, for the latter ratios so that scale cancels.

Pivotal quantities are fundamental to the construction of test statistics, as they allow the statistic to not depend on parameters – for example, Student's t-statistic is for a normal distribution with unknown variance (and mean). They also provide one method of constructing confidence intervals, and the use of pivotal quantities improves performance of the bootstrap. In the form of ancillary statistics, they can be used to construct frequentist prediction intervals (predictive confidence intervals).

== Examples ==
=== Normal distribution ===
One of the simplest pivotal quantities is the z-score. Given a normal distribution with mean $\mu$ and variance $\sigma^2$, and an observation $x$, the $z$-score:

$$z = \frac{x - \mu}{\sigma},$$

has distribution $N(0,1)$ – a normal distribution with mean 0 and variance 1. Similarly, since the $n$-sample sample mean has sampling distribution $N(\mu,\sigma^2/n)$, the z-score of the mean

$$z = \frac{\overline{X} - \mu}{\sigma/\sqrt{n}}$$

also has distribution $N(0,1).$ Note that while these functions depend on the parameters – and thus one can only compute them if the parameters are known (they are not statistics) — the distribution is independent of the parameters.

Given $n$ independent, identically distributed (i.i.d.) observations $X = (X_1, X_2, \ldots, X_n)$ from the normal distribution with unknown mean $\mu$ and variance $\sigma^2$, a pivotal quantity can be obtained from the function:

$$g(x,X) = \frac{x - \overline{X}}{s/\sqrt{n}}$$

where

$$\overline{X} = \frac{1}{n}\sum_{i=1}^n{X_i}$$

and

$$s^2 = \frac{1}{n-1}\sum_{i=1}^n{(X_i - \overline{X})^2}$$

are unbiased estimates of $\mu$ and $\sigma^2$, respectively. The function $g(x,X)$ is the Student's t-statistic for a new value $x$, to be drawn from the same population as the already observed set of values $X$.

Using $x=\mu$ the function $g(\mu,X)$ becomes a pivotal quantity, which is also distributed by the Student's t-distribution with $\nu = n-1$ degrees of freedom. As required, even though $\mu$ appears as an argument to the function $g$, the distribution of $g(\mu,X)$ does not depend on the parameters $\mu$ or $\sigma$ of the normal probability distribution that governs the observations $X_1,\ldots,X_n$.

This can be used to compute a prediction interval for the next observation $X_{n+1};$ see Prediction interval: Normal distribution.

=== Bivariate normal distribution ===
In more complicated cases, it is impossible to construct exact pivots. However, having approximate pivots improves convergence to asymptotic normality.

Suppose a sample of size $n$ of vectors $(X_i,Y_i)'$ is taken from a bivariate bivariate normal distribution with unknown correlation $\rho$.

An estimator of $\rho$ is the sample (Pearson, moment) correlation

$$r = \frac{\frac1{n-1} \sum_{i=1}^n (X_i - \overline{X})(Y_i - \overline{Y})}{s_X s_Y}$$

where $s_X^2, s_Y^2$ are sample variances of $X$ and $Y$. The sample statistic $r$ has an asymptotically normal distribution:

$$\sqrt{n}\frac{r-\rho}{1-\rho^2} \Rightarrow N(0,1)$$.

However, a variance-stabilizing transformation

$$z = \rm{tanh}^{-1} r = \frac12 \ln \frac{1+r}{1-r}$$

known as Fisher's 'z' transformation of the correlation coefficient allows creating the distribution of $z$ asymptotically independent of unknown parameters:

$$\sqrt{n}(z-\zeta) \Rightarrow N(0,1)$$

where $\zeta = {\rm tanh}^{-1} \rho$ is the corresponding distribution parameter. For finite samples sizes $n$, the random variable $z$ will have distribution closer to normal than that of $r$. An even closer approximation to the standard normal distribution is obtained by using a better approximation for the exact variance: the usual form is

$$\operatorname{Var}(z) \approx \frac1{n-3}$$.

== Robustness ==
From the point of view of robust statistics, pivotal quantities are robust to changes in the parameters — indeed, independent of the parameters — but not in general robust to changes in the model, such as violations of the assumption of normality. This is fundamental to the robust critique of non-robust statistics, often derived from pivotal quantities: such statistics may be robust within the family, but are not robust outside it.

== See also ==
- Normalization (statistics)
