= Loni Tabb =

American biostatistician

Loni Philip Tabb (née Loni Patrice Philip) is an American biostatistician whose research applies spatial statistics in epidemiology to understand the geographic and racial distribution of societal problems including violence, alcohol abuse, health care disparities, and cardiovascular health. She is an associate professor of biostatistics in the Drexel University School of Public Health, and also serves as the school's associate dean for faculty affairs.

== Education and career ==
Tabb is African-American; her parents were emigrants to the United States from Saint Vincent and the Grenadines and from Grenada. She majored in mathematics at Drexel University, after switching topics from business administration; she received a bachelor's degree in 2003 and a master's degree in 2005. She credits Ewaugh Finney Fields, an African-American female mathematics professor at Drexel, as a mentor who encouraged her to push her studies farther.

Continuing her studies in biostatistics at Harvard University, she received a second master's degree in 2007 and completed her Ph.D. in 2010. Her dissertation, Multilevel Models for Zero-Inflated Count Data in Environmental Health and Health Disparities Research, was advised by Brent Coull.

Tabb returned to Drexel as an assistant professor of biostatistics in 2009, before completing her Ph.D. She was tenured as an associate professor in 2017, and has been associate dean for faculty affairs since 2023.

== Recognition ==
In 2021, Tabb became the inaugural recipient of the Annie T. Randall Innovator Award of the American Statistical Association Biometrics Section and Mental Health Statistics Section. She was elected as a Fellow of the American Statistical Association in 2026.
