= Ivy Liu =

Taiwanese and New Zealand statistician

- Education: Iowa State University; University of Florida
- Scientific career
- Fields: Statistics
- Doctoral advisor: Alan Agresti

Ivy I-Ming Liu is a Taiwanese and New Zealander statistician specializing in categorical and ordinal data. She works as an associate professor and as head of the School of Mathematics and Statistics at Victoria University of Wellington in New Zealand.

== Biography ==
Liu is originally from Taiwan and has a master's degree from Iowa State University. She completed her Ph.D. in 1995 at the University of Florida under the supervision of Alan Agresti.

After returning to Taiwan to work at National Chung Hsing University, she came to the University of Waikato in February 1999 for a one-year visiting lectureship, before moving to Victoria University.

She initially chose to work in categorical data with the hope that she could collaborate with her husband, then studying sociology. However, he moved to different work before that hope could pan out. More specifically, her research has concerned differential item functioning, dimension reduction for data whose components have mixed types, and multiple response data (survey data in which respondents can provide multiple answers to a question).
