= Alan Agresti =

American statistician

- Born: February 6, 1947 (age 79)
- Education: University of Rochester; University of Wisconsin–Madison
- Known for: Categorical data analysis Agresti–Coull interval
- Scientific career
- Fields: Statistics
- Thesis: Bounds on the Extinction-Time Distribution of a Branching Process
- Doctoral advisor: Stephen Stigler
- Doctoral students: Ivy Liu; Brent Coull

Alan Gilbert Agresti (born February 6, 1947) is an American statistician and Distinguished Professor Emeritus at the University of Florida. He has written several textbooks on categorical data analysis that are considered seminal in the field.

The Agresti–Coull confidence interval for a binomial proportion is named after him and his doctoral student Brent Coull.

== Biography ==
Agresti earned his bachelor's degree in mathematics from the University of Rochester in 1968. He earned his doctorate in statistics from the University of Wisconsin–Madison in 1972. His doctoral advisor was Stephen Stigler and his thesis work was on stochastic processes.

He was a professor of statistics for many years at the University of Florida, from 1972 until his retirement in 2010 as a Distinguished Professor. He was also a visiting professor at the department of statistics at Harvard University for several years. Notable doctoral students include Ivy Liu and Brent Coull.

He wrote the textbook Categorical Data Analysis during a sabbatical year at Imperial College.

According to Scholar Google, his books and articles have been cited more than 85,000 times.

He has taught short courses about categorical data analysis for 30 years at universities around the world, including at several Italian universities, and in 2017 became a dual citizen of Italy and the United States.

== Honors and awards ==
He became a fellow of the American Statistical Association in 1990 and a fellow of the Institute of Mathematical Statistics in 2008.

He received an honorary doctorate from De Montfort University in 1999.

He was named "Statistician of the Year" by the Chicago chapter of the American Statistical Association in 2003.

The workshop "Categorical Data Analysis & Friends" was held in his honor in Florence, Italy in 2019.

He received a Distinguished Achievement Award from School of Computer, Data & Information Sciences, University of Wisconsin (Madison), in 2026.

== Personal life ==
His wife is Jacki Levine.

== Selected works ==
=== Textbooks ===
Agresti has written several books on categorical data analysis, including An Introduction to Categorical Data Analysis and Categorical Data Analysis.

Other textbooks include the following:

- Statistics: The Art and Science of Learning from Data
- Statistical Methods for the Social Sciences
- Analysis of Ordinal Categorical Data, Second Edition
- Foundations of Linear and Generalized Linear Models
- Foundations of Statistics for Data Scientists, with R and Python (with Maria Kateri)
- Foundations of Bayesian Statistics for Data Scientists, with R and Python (with Maria Kateri, Ranjini Grove, and Antonietta Mira)
- Strength in Numbers: The Rising of Academic Statistics Departments in the U.S. (edited with Xiao-Li Meng)

=== Articles ===
- "A Survey of Exact Inference for Contingency Tables", 1992
