= Pearson's chi-squared test =

Evaluates how likely it is that any difference between data sets arose by chance

Pearson's chi-squared test or Pearson's $\chi^2$ test is a statistical test applied to sets of categorical data to evaluate how likely it is that any observed difference between the sets arose by chance. It is the most widely used of many chi-squared tests (e.g., Yates, likelihood ratio, portmanteau test in time series, etc.) – statistical procedures whose results are evaluated by reference to the chi-squared distribution. Its properties were first investigated by Karl Pearson in 1900. In contexts where it is important to improve a distinction between the test statistic and its distribution, names similar to Pearson χ-squared test or statistic are used. It is a p-value test.

A simple example is testing the hypothesis that an ordinary six-sided die is "fair" (i. e., all six outcomes are equally likely to occur). In this case, the observed data is $(O_1, O_2, ..., O_6)$, the number of times that the die has fallen on each number. The null hypothesis is $\mathrm{Multinomial}(N; 1/6, ..., 1/6)$, and $\chi^2 := \sum\limits_{i=1}^6 \frac{{\left(O_i - N/6\right)}^2}{N /6}$. As detailed below, if $\chi^2 > 11.07$, then the fairness of the die can be rejected at the level of $p < 0.05$.

== Procedure ==
The setup is as follows:

- Before the experiment, the experimenter fixes a certain number $N$ of samples to take.
- The observed data is $(O_1, O_2, ..., O_n)$, the count number of samples from a finite set of given categories. They satisfy $\sum_i O_i = N$.
- The null hypothesis is that the count numbers are sampled from a multinomial distribution $\mathrm{Multinomial}(N; p_1, ..., p_n)$. That is, the underlying data is sampled IID from a categorical distribution $\mathrm{Categorical}(p_1, ..., p_n)$ over the given categories.
- The Pearson's chi-squared test statistic is defined as $\chi^2 := \sum_i \frac{{\left(O_i - N p_i\right)}^2}{N p_i}$. The p-value of the test statistic is computed either numerically or by looking it up in a table.
- If the p-value is small enough (usually p < 0.05 by convention), then the null hypothesis is rejected, and we conclude that the observed data does not follow the multinomial distribution.

== Usage ==
Pearson's chi-squared test is used to assess three types of comparison: goodness of fit, homogeneity, and independence.

- A test of goodness of fit establishes whether an observed frequency distribution differs from a theoretical distribution.
- A test of homogeneity compares the distribution of counts for two or more groups using the same categorical variable (e.g. choice of activity—college, military, employment, travel—of graduates of a high school reported a year after graduation, sorted by graduation year, to see if number of graduates choosing a given activity has changed from class to class, or from decade to decade).
- A test of independence assesses whether observations consisting of measures on two variables, expressed in a contingency table, are independent of each other (e.g. polling responses from people of different nationalities to see if one's nationality is related to the response).

For all three tests, the computational procedure includes the following steps:

1. Calculate the chi-squared test statistic, $\chi^2$, which resembles a normalized sum of squared deviations between observed and theoretical frequencies (see below).
2. Determine the degrees of freedom, df, of that statistic.
  1. For a test of goodness-of-fit, df = Cats − Params, where Cats is the number of observation categories recognized by the model, and Params is the number of parameters in the model adjusted to make the model best fit the observations: The number of categories reduced by the number of fitted parameters in the distribution.
  2. For a test of homogeneity, df = (Rows − 1)×(Cols − 1), where Rows corresponds to the number of categories (i.e. rows in the associated contingency table), and Cols corresponds to the number of independent groups (i.e. columns in the associated contingency table).
  3. For a test of independence, df = (Rows − 1)×(Cols − 1), where in this case, Rows corresponds to the number of categories in one variable, and Cols corresponds to the number of categories in the second variable.
3. Select a desired level of confidence (significance level, p-value, or the corresponding alpha level) for the result of the test.
4. Compare $\chi^2$ to the critical value from the chi-squared distribution with df degrees of freedom and the selected confidence level (one-sided, since the test is only in one direction, i.e. is the test value greater than the critical value?), which in many cases gives a good approximation of the distribution of $\chi^2$.
5. Sustain or reject the null hypothesis that the observed frequency distribution is the same as the theoretical distribution based on whether the test statistic exceeds the critical value of $\chi^2$. If the test statistic exceeds the critical value of $\chi^2$, the null hypothesis ($H_0$ = there is no difference between the distributions) can be rejected, and the alternative hypothesis ($H_1$ = there is a difference between the distributions) can be accepted, both with the selected level of confidence. If the test statistic falls below the threshold $\chi^2$ value, then no clear conclusion can be reached, and the null hypothesis is sustained (we fail to reject the null hypothesis), though not necessarily accepted.

== Test for fit of a distribution ==
=== Discrete uniform distribution ===
In this case $N$ observations are divided among $n$ cells. A simple application is to test the hypothesis that, in the general population, values would occur in each cell with equal frequency. The "theoretical frequency" for any cell (under the null hypothesis of a discrete uniform distribution) is thus calculated as
$$E_i=\frac{N}{n}\, ,$$
and the reduction in the degrees of freedom is $p=1$, notionally because the observed frequencies $O_i$ are constrained to sum to $N$.

One specific example of its application would be its application for log-rank test.

=== Other distributions ===
When testing whether observations are random variables whose distribution belongs to a given family of distributions, the "theoretical frequencies" are calculated using a distribution from that family fitted in some standard way. The reduction in the degrees of freedom is calculated as $p=s+1$, where $s$ is the number of parameters used in fitting the distribution. For instance, when checking a three-parameter Generalized gamma distribution, $p=4$, and when checking a normal distribution (where the parameters are mean and standard deviation), $p=3$, and when checking a Poisson distribution (where the parameter is the expected value), $p=2$. Thus, there will be $n-p$ degrees of freedom, where $n$ is the number of categories.

The degrees of freedom are not based on the number of observations as with a Student's t or F-distribution. For example, if testing for a fair, six-sided die, there would be five degrees of freedom because there are six categories or parameters (each number); the number of times the die is rolled does not influence the number of degrees of freedom.

=== Calculating the test-statistic ===
Chi-squared distribution, showing X^{2} on the x-axis and P-value on the y-axis.

Upper-tail critical values of chi-square distribution
Degrees of freedom	Probability less than the critical value				
Degrees of freedom	0.90	0.95	0.975	0.99	0.999
1	2.706	3.841	5.024	6.635	10.828
2	4.605	5.991	7.378	9.210	13.816
3	6.251	7.815	9.348	11.345	16.266
4	7.779	9.488	11.143	13.277	18.467
5	9.236	11.070	12.833	15.086	20.515
6	10.645	12.592	14.449	16.812	22.458
7	12.017	14.067	16.013	18.475	24.322
8	13.362	15.507	17.535	20.090	26.125
9	14.684	16.919	19.023	21.666	27.877
10	15.987	18.307	20.483	23.209	29.588
11	17.275	19.675	21.920	24.725	31.264
12	18.549	21.026	23.337	26.217	32.910
13	19.812	22.362	24.736	27.688	34.528
14	21.064	23.685	26.119	29.141	36.123
15	22.307	24.996	27.488	30.578	37.697
16	23.542	26.296	28.845	32.000	39.252
17	24.769	27.587	30.191	33.409	40.790
18	25.989	28.869	31.526	34.805	42.312
19	27.204	30.144	32.852	36.191	43.820
20	28.412	31.410	34.170	37.566	45.315
21	29.615	32.671	35.479	38.932	46.797
22	30.813	33.924	36.781	40.289	48.268
23	32.007	35.172	38.076	41.638	49.728
24	33.196	36.415	39.364	42.980	51.179
25	34.382	37.652	40.646	44.314	52.620
26	35.563	38.885	41.923	45.642	54.052
27	36.741	40.113	43.195	46.963	55.476
28	37.916	41.337	44.461	48.278	56.892
29	39.087	42.557	45.722	49.588	58.301
30	40.256	43.773	46.979	50.892	59.703
31	41.422	44.985	48.232	52.191	61.098
32	42.585	46.194	49.480	53.486	62.487
33	43.745	47.400	50.725	54.776	63.870
34	44.903	48.602	51.966	56.061	65.247
35	46.059	49.802	53.203	57.342	66.619
36	47.212	50.998	54.437	58.619	67.985
37	48.363	52.192	55.668	59.893	69.347
38	49.513	53.384	56.896	61.162	70.703
39	50.660	54.572	58.120	62.428	72.055
40	51.805	55.758	59.342	63.691	73.402
41	52.949	56.942	60.561	64.950	74.745
42	54.090	58.124	61.777	66.206	76.084
43	55.230	59.304	62.990	67.459	77.419
44	56.369	60.481	64.201	68.710	78.750
45	57.505	61.656	65.410	69.957	80.077
46	58.641	62.830	66.617	71.201	81.400
47	59.774	64.001	67.821	72.443	82.720
48	60.907	65.171	69.023	73.683	84.037
49	62.038	66.339	70.222	74.919	85.351
50	63.167	67.505	71.420	76.154	86.661
51	64.295	68.669	72.616	77.386	87.968
52	65.422	69.832	73.810	78.616	89.272
53	66.548	70.993	75.002	79.843	90.573
54	67.673	72.153	76.192	81.069	91.872
55	68.796	73.311	77.380	82.292	93.168
56	69.919	74.468	78.567	83.513	94.461
57	71.040	75.624	79.752	84.733	95.751
58	72.160	76.778	80.936	85.950	97.039
59	73.279	77.931	82.117	87.166	98.324
60	74.397	79.082	83.298	88.379	99.607
61	75.514	80.232	84.476	89.591	100.888
62	76.630	81.381	85.654	90.802	102.166
63	77.745	82.529	86.830	92.010	103.442
64	78.860	83.675	88.004	93.217	104.716
65	79.973	84.821	89.177	94.422	105.988
66	81.085	85.965	90.349	95.626	107.258
67	82.197	87.108	91.519	96.828	108.526
68	83.308	88.250	92.689	98.028	109.791
69	84.418	89.391	93.856	99.228	111.055
70	85.527	90.531	95.023	100.425	112.317
71	86.635	91.670	96.189	101.621	113.577
72	87.743	92.808	97.353	102.816	114.835
73	88.850	93.945	98.516	104.010	116.092
74	89.956	95.081	99.678	105.202	117.346
75	91.061	96.217	100.839	106.393	118.599
76	92.166	97.351	101.999	107.583	119.850
77	93.270	98.484	103.158	108.771	121.100
78	94.374	99.617	104.316	109.958	122.348
79	95.476	100.749	105.473	111.144	123.594
80	96.578	101.879	106.629	112.329	124.839
81	97.680	103.010	107.783	113.512	126.083
82	98.780	104.139	108.937	114.695	127.324
83	99.880	105.267	110.090	115.876	128.565
84	100.980	106.395	111.242	117.057	129.804
85	102.079	107.522	112.393	118.236	131.041
86	103.177	108.648	113.544	119.414	132.277
87	104.275	109.773	114.693	120.591	133.512
88	105.372	110.898	115.841	121.767	134.746
89	106.469	112.022	116.989	122.942	135.978
90	107.565	113.145	118.136	124.116	137.208
91	108.661	114.268	119.282	125.289	138.438
92	109.756	115.390	120.427	126.462	139.666
93	110.850	116.511	121.571	127.633	140.893
94	111.944	117.632	122.715	128.803	142.119
95	113.038	118.752	123.858	129.973	143.344
96	114.131	119.871	125.000	131.141	144.567
97	115.223	120.990	126.141	132.309	145.789
98	116.315	122.108	127.282	133.476	147.010
99	117.407	123.225	128.422	134.642	148.230
100	118.498	124.342	129.561	135.807	149.449

The value of the test-statistic is

$$\chi^2 = \sum_{i=1}^{n} \frac{{\left(O_i - E_i\right)}^2}{E_i}
=  N \sum_{i=1}^n \frac{\left(O_i/N - p_i\right)^2}{p_i}$$

where

- $\chi^2$ = Pearson's cumulative test statistic, which asymptotically approaches a $\chi^2$ distribution.
- $O_i$ = the number of observations of type i.
- $N$ = total number of observations
- $E_i = N p_i$ = the expected (theoretical) count of type i, asserted by the null hypothesis that the fraction of type i in the population is $p_i$
- $n$ = the number of cells in the table.

The chi-squared statistic can then be used to calculate a p-value by comparing the value of the statistic to a chi-squared distribution. The number of degrees of freedom is equal to the number of cells $n$, minus the reduction in degrees of freedom, $p$.

The chi-squared statistic can be also calculated as

$$\chi^2 = \sum_{i=1}^{n} \frac{O_i^2}{E_i} - N.$$

This result is the consequence of the Binomial theorem.

The result about the numbers of degrees of freedom is valid when the original data are multinomial and hence the estimated parameters are efficient for minimizing the chi-squared statistic. More generally however, when maximum likelihood estimation does not coincide with minimum chi-squared estimation, the distribution will lie somewhere between a chi-squared distribution with $n-1-p$ and $n-1$ degrees of freedom (See for instance Chernoff and Lehmann, 1954).

The chi-squared test indicates a statistically significant association between the level of education completed and routine check-up attendance (chi2(3) = 14.6090, p = 0.002). The proportions suggest that as the level of education increases, so does the proportion of individuals attending routine check-ups. Specifically, individuals who have graduated from college or university attend routine check-ups at a higher proportion (31.52%) compared to those who have not graduated high school (8.44%). This finding may suggest that higher educational attainment is associated with a greater likelihood of engaging in health-promoting behaviors such as routine check-ups.

=== Bayesian method ===
In Bayesian statistics, one would instead use a Dirichlet distribution as conjugate prior. If one took a uniform prior, then the maximum likelihood estimate for the population probability is the observed probability, and one may compute a credible region around this or another estimate.

== Testing for statistical independence ==
In this case, an "observation" consists of the values of two outcomes and the null hypothesis is that the occurrence of these outcomes is statistically independent. Each observation is allocated to one cell of a two-dimensional array of cells (called a contingency table) according to the values of the two outcomes. If there are r rows and c columns in the table, the "theoretical frequency" for a cell, given the hypothesis of independence, is

$$E_{i,j}= N  p_{i\cdot} p_{\cdot j} ,$$

where $N$ is the total sample size (the sum of all cells in the table), and

$$p_{i\cdot} = \frac{O_{i\cdot}}{N} = \sum_{j=1}^c \frac{O_{i,j}}{N},$$

is the fraction of observations of type i ignoring the column attribute (fraction of row totals), and
$$p_{\cdot j} = \frac{O_{\cdot j}}{N}  = \sum_{i = 1}^r \frac{O_{i,j}}{N}$$

is the fraction of observations of type j ignoring the row attribute (fraction of column totals). The term "frequencies" refers to absolute numbers rather than already normalized values.

The value of the test-statistic is

$$\begin{align}
\chi^2 &= \sum_{i=1}^r \sum_{j=1}^c \frac{{\left(O_{i,j} - E_{i,j}\right)}^2}{E_{i,j}} \\[1ex]
&= N \sum_{i,j} p_{i\cdot} p_{\cdot j} {\left(\frac{\left(O_{i,j}/N\right) - p_{i\cdot} p_{\cdot j}}{p_{i\cdot} p_{\cdot j}}\right)}^2
\end{align}$$

Note that $\chi^2$ is 0 if and only if $O_{i,j} = E_{i,j} \forall i,j$, i.e. only if the expected and true number of observations are equal in all cells.

Fitting the model of "independence" reduces the number of degrees of freedom by p = r + c − 1. The number of degrees of freedom is equal to the number of cells rc, minus the reduction in degrees of freedom, p, which reduces to (r − 1)(c − 1).

For the test of independence, also known as the test of homogeneity, a chi-squared probability of less than or equal to 0.05 (or the chi-squared statistic being at or larger than the 0.05 critical point) is commonly interpreted by applied workers as justification for rejecting the null hypothesis that the row variable is independent of the column variable. The alternative hypothesis corresponds to the variables having an association or relationship where the structure of this relationship is not specified.

== Assumptions ==
The chi-squared test, when used with the standard approximation that a chi-squared distribution is applicable, has the following assumptions:

Simple random sample
The sample data is a random sampling from a fixed distribution or population where every collection of members of the population of the given sample size has an equal probability of selection. Variants of the test have been developed for complex samples, such as where the data is weighted. Other forms can be used such as purposive sampling.
Sample size (whole table)
A sample with a sufficiently large size is assumed. If a chi squared test is conducted on a sample with a smaller size, then the chi squared test will yield an inaccurate inference. The researcher, by using chi squared test on small samples, might end up committing a Type II error. For small sample sizes the Cash test is preferred.
Expected cell count
Adequate expected cell counts. Some require 5 or more, and others require 10 or more. A common rule is 5 or more in all cells of a 2-by-2 table, and 5 or more in 80% of cells in larger tables, but no cells with zero expected count. When this assumption is not met, Yates's correction is applied.
Independence
The observations are always assumed to be independent of each other. This means chi-squared cannot be used to test correlated data (like matched pairs or panel data). In those cases, McNemar's test may be more appropriate.

A test that relies on different assumptions is Fisher's exact test; if its assumption of fixed marginal distributions is met it is substantially more accurate in obtaining a significance level, especially with few observations. In the vast majority of applications this assumption will not be met, and Fisher's exact test will be over conservative and not have correct coverage.

== Derivation ==
Derivation using central limit theorem

The null distribution of the Pearson statistic with j rows and k columns is approximated by the chi-squared distribution with (k − 1)(j − 1) degrees of freedom.

This approximation arises as the true distribution, under the null hypothesis, if the expected value is given by a multinomial distribution. For large sample sizes, the central limit theorem says this distribution tends toward a certain multivariate normal distribution.

=== Two cells ===
In the special case where there are only two cells in the table, the expected values follow a binomial distribution,
$$O \sim \operatorname{Bin}(n,p),$$
where

p = probability, under the null hypothesis,
n = number of observations in the sample.

In the above example the hypothesised probability of a male observation is 0.5, with 100 samples. Thus we expect to observe 50 males.

If n is sufficiently large, the above binomial distribution may be approximated by a Gaussian (normal) distribution and thus the Pearson test statistic approximates a chi-squared distribution,
$$\operatorname{Bin}(n,p) \approx \mathcal{N}\big(np, np(1 - p)\big).$$

Let O_{1} be the number of observations from the sample that are in the first cell. The Pearson test statistic can be expressed as
$$\frac{(O_1 - np)^2}{np} + \frac{\big(n - O_1 - n(1 - p)\big)^2}{n(1 - p)},$$
which can in turn be expressed as
$$\left(\frac{O_1 - np}{\sqrt{np(1 - p)}}\right)^2.$$

By the normal approximation to a binomial, this is the squared of one standard normal variate, and hence is distributed as chi-squared with 1 degree of freedom. Note that the denominator is one standard deviation of the Gaussian approximation, so can be written
$$\frac{(O_1 - \mu)^2}{\sigma^2}.$$

So as consistent with the meaning of the chi-squared distribution, we are measuring how probable the observed number of standard deviations away from the mean is under the Gaussian approximation (which is a good approximation for large n).

The chi-squared distribution is then integrated on the right of the statistic value to obtain the p-value, which is equal to the probability of getting a statistic equal or bigger than the observed one, assuming the null hypothesis.

=== Two-by-two contingency tables ===
When the test is applied to a contingency table containing two rows and two columns, the test is equivalent to a Z-test of proportions.

=== Many cells ===
Broadly similar arguments as above lead to the desired result, though the details are more involved. One may apply an orthogonal change of variables to turn the limiting summands in the test statistic into one fewer squares of i.i.d. standard normal random variables.

Let us now prove that the distribution indeed approaches asymptotically the $\chi^2$ distribution as the number of observations approaches infinity.

Let $n$ be the number of observations, $m$ the number of cells and $p_i$ the probability of an observation to fall in the i-th cell, for $1 \le i \le m$. We denote by $\{k_i\}$ the configuration where for each i there are $k_i$ observations in the i-th cell. Note that
$$\sum_{i=1}^m k_i = n \quad \text{and} \quad \sum_{i=1}^m p_i = 1.$$

Let $\chi^2_P(\{k_i\}, \{p_i\})$ be Pearson's cumulative test statistic for such a configuration, and let $\chi^2_P(\{p_i\})$ be the distribution of this statistic. We will show that the latter probability approaches the $\chi^2$ distribution with $m - 1$ degrees of freedom, as $n \to \infty.$

For any arbitrary value T:
$$P\big(\chi^2_P(\{p_i\}) > T\big) = \sum_{\{k_i \mid \chi^2_P(\{k_i\}, \{p_i\}) > T\}} \frac{n!}{k_1! \cdots k_m!} \prod_{i=1}^m {p_i}^{k_i}.$$

We will use a procedure similar to the approximation in de Moivre–Laplace theorem. Contributions from small $k_i$ are of subleading order in $n$ and thus for large $n$ we may use Stirling's formula for both $n!$ and $k_i!$ to get the following:
$$P\big(\chi^2_P(\{p_i\}) > T\big) \sim \sum_{\{k_i \mid \chi^2_P(\{k_i\},\{p_i\}) > T \}} \prod_{i=1}^m \left(\frac{np_i}{k_i}\right)^{k_i} \sqrt{\frac{2\pi n}{\prod_{i=1}^m 2\pi k_i}}.$$

By substituting for
$$x_i = \frac{k_i - np_i}{\sqrt{n}}, \quad i = 1, \cdots, m - 1,$$
we may approximate for large $n$ the sum over the $k_i$ by an integral over the $x_i$. Noting that
$$k_m = np_m - \sqrt{n} \sum_{i=1}^{m-1} x_i,$$
we arrive at
$$\begin{align}
P\big(\chi^2_P(\{p_i\}\big) > T)
&\sim \sqrt{\frac{2\pi n}{\prod_{i=1}^m 2\pi k_i}} \int_\Omega \left[ \prod_{i=1}^{m-1} \sqrt{n} dx_i \right] \times \\
& \qquad \times \left \{\prod_{i=1}^{m-1} \left(1 + \frac{x_i}{\sqrt{n} p_i}\right)^{-(n p_i + \sqrt{n} x_i) } \left(1 - \frac{\sum_{i=1}^{m-1} x_i}{\sqrt{n} p_m}\right)^{-\left(n p_m-\sqrt{n} \sum_{i=1}^{m-1} x_i\right)} \right\} \\
&= \sqrt{\frac{2\pi n}{\prod_{i=1}^m \left(2\pi n p_i + 2\pi \sqrt{n} x_i\right)}} \int_\Omega \left\{\prod_{i=1}^{m-1} {\sqrt{n} dx_i}\right\} \times \\
& \qquad \times \left\{ \prod_{i=1}^{m-1} \exp\left[-\left(n p_i + \sqrt{n} x_i \right) \ln \left(1 + \frac{x_i}{\sqrt{n} p_i}\right)\right] \exp \left[ -\left(n p_m - \sqrt{n} \sum_{i=1}^{m-1} x_i\right) \ln \left(1 - \frac{\sum_{i=1}^{m-1} x_i}{\sqrt{n} p_m}\right) \right] \right\},
\end{align}$$
where $\Omega$ is the set defined through $\chi^2_P(\{k_i\}, \{p_i\}) = \chi^2_P(\{\sqrt{n} x_i + n p_i\}, \{p_i\}) > T$.

By expanding the logarithm and taking the leading terms in $n$, we get
$$P\big(\chi^2_P(\{p_i\}) > T\big) \sim  \frac{1}{\sqrt{(2\pi)^{m-1} \prod_{i=1}^m p_i}} \int_\Omega \left[ \prod_{i=1}^{m-1} dx_i\right] \prod_{i=1}^{m-1} \exp\left[-\frac{1}{2} \sum_{i=1}^{m-1} \frac{x_i^2}{p_i} - \frac{1}{2p_m} \left(\sum_{i=1}^{m-1} x_i\right)^2 \right].$$

Pearson's chi, $\chi^2_P(\{k_i\}, \{p_i\}) = \chi^2_P(\{\sqrt{n} x_i + n p_i\}, \{p_i\})$, is precisely the argument of the exponent (except for the −1/2; note that the final term in the exponent's argument is equal to $(k_m - n p_m)^2/(n p_m)$).

This argument can be written as
$$-\frac{1}{2} \sum_{i,j=1}^{m-1} x_i A_{ij} x_j, \quad A_{ij} = \frac{\delta_{ij}}{p_i} + \frac{1}{p_m}, \quad i, j = 1, \cdots, m - 1.$$

$A$ is a regular symmetric $(m - 1) \times (m - 1)$ matrix, and hence diagonalizable. It is therefore possible to make a linear change of variables in $\{x_i\}$ so as to get $m - 1$ new variables $\{y_i\}$ so that
$$\sum_{i,j=1}^{m-1} x_i A_{ij} x_j = \sum_{i=1}^{m-1} y_i^2.$$

This linear change of variables merely multiplies the integral by a constant Jacobian, so we get
$$P\big(\chi^2_P(\{p_i\}) > T\big) \sim C \int_{\sum_{i=1}^{m-1} y_i^2 > T} \left\{\prod_{i=1}^{m-1} dy_i \right\} \prod_{i=1}^{m-1} \exp\left[-\frac{1}{2} \left(\sum_{i=1}^{m-1} y_i^2 \right)\right],$$
where C is a constant.

This is the probability that squared sum of $m - 1$ independent normally distributed variables of zero mean and unit variance will be greater than T, namely that $\chi^2$ with $m - 1$ degrees of freedom is larger than T.

We have thus shown that at the limit where $n \to \infty,$ the distribution of Pearson's chi approaches the chi distribution with $m - 1$ degrees of freedom.

An alternative derivation is on the multinomial distribution page.

== Examples ==
=== Fairness of dice ===
A 6-sided die is thrown 60 times. The number of times it lands with 1, 2, 3, 4, 5 and 6 face up is 5, 8, 9, 8, 10 and 20, respectively. Is the die biased, according to the Pearson's chi-squared test at a significance level of 95% and/or 99%?

The null hypothesis is that the die is unbiased, hence each number is expected to occur the same number of times, in this case, 60/n = 10. The outcomes can be tabulated as follows:

$i$	$O_i$	$E_i$	$O_i - E_i$	$(O_i - E_i)^2$
1	5	10	−5	25
2	8	10	−2	4
3	9	10	−1	1
4	8	10	−2	4
5	10	10	0	0
6	20	10	10	100
Sum				134

We then consult an Upper-tail critical values of chi-square distribution table, the tabular value refers to the sum of the squared variables each divided by the expected outcomes. For the present example, this means
$$\chi^2 = \frac{25}{10} + \frac{4}{10} + \frac{1}{10} + \frac{4}{10} + \frac{0}{10} + \frac{100}{10} = 13.4.$$

This is the experimental result whose unlikeliness (with a fair die) we wish to estimate.

Degrees of freedom	Probability less than the critical value				
Degrees of freedom	0.90	0.95	0.975	0.99	0.999
5	9.236	11.070	12.833	15.086	20.515

The experimental sum of 13.4 is between the critical values of 97.5% and 99% significance or confidence (p-value). Specifically, getting 20 rolls of 6, when the expectation is only 10 such values, is unlikely with a fair die.

=== Chi-squared goodness of fit test ===
In this context, the frequencies of both theoretical and empirical distributions are unnormalised counts, and for a chi-squared test the total sample sizes $N$ of both these distributions (sums of all cells of the corresponding contingency tables) have to be the same.

For example, to test the hypothesis that a random sample of 100 people has been drawn from a population in which men and women are equal in frequency, the observed number of men and women would be compared to the theoretical frequencies of 50 men and 50 women. If there were 44 men in the sample and 56 women, then

$$\chi^2 = \frac{{\left(44 - 50\right)}^2}{50} + \frac{{\left(56 - 50\right)}^2}{50} = 1.44.$$

If the null hypothesis is true (i.e., men and women are chosen with equal probability), the test statistic will be drawn from a chi-squared distribution with one degree of freedom (because if the male frequency is known, then the female frequency is determined).

Consultation of the chi-squared distribution for 1 degree of freedom shows that the probability of observing this difference (or a more extreme difference than this) if men and women are equally numerous in the population is approximately 0.23. This probability is higher than conventional criteria for statistical significance (0.01 or 0.05), so normally we would not reject the null hypothesis that the number of men in the population is the same as the number of women (i.e., we would consider our sample within the range of what we would expect for a 50/50 male–female ratio.)

=== Chi-squared test for homogeneity ===
The chi-squared test for homogeneity of proportions (that is, comparing proportions across groups in a contingency table) is frequently used to verify if the rows of a given nonnegative $m \times n$ contingency matrix $A$ are proportional.

Consider $T$ outcomes of multinomial trials classified according to two criteria: membership in one of $n$ groups and assignment to one of $m$ categories. The outcomes may be arranged in an $m\times n$ contingency table, where $O_{ij}$ denotes the observed frequency in row $i$ and column $j$, with row totals $O_{i\cdot}$, column totals $O_{\cdot j}$ and grand total $T$.

Let $O_{ij}$ denote the observed frequency in the cell corresponding to row $i$ and column $j$, for $i = 1, 2, \dots, m$ and $j = 1, 2, \dots, n$. Define the row sums

$R_i = \sum_{j=1}^{n} O_{ij}, \quad i=1,\dots,m,$

the column sums

$C_j = \sum_{i=1}^{m} O_{ij}, \quad j=1,\dots,n,$

and the grand total

$T = \sum_{i=1}^{m} \sum_{j=1}^{n} O_{ij}.$

The null hypothesis is

$H_0 : \pi_{1j} = \pi_{2j} = \cdots = \pi_{mj}, \quad \forall j \in {1,\dots,n},$

where $\pi_{ij} \in [0,1]$ denotes the proportion of individuals in group $i$ falling into category $j$, with $\sum_{j=1}^n \pi_{ij} = 1$ for each $i$.

Under $H_0$, the expected frequency in cell $(i,j)$ is

$E_{ij} = \tfrac{R_i C_j}{T}, \quad i=1,\dots,m;; j=1,\dots,n.$

The Pearson chi-squared test statistic is then

$\chi^2_{\text{stat}} = \sum_{i=1}^{m} \sum_{j=1}^{n} \frac{(O_{ij} - E_{ij})^2}{E_{ij}}.$

For example, suppose there are two groups of students (Group 1 and Group 2) and three study preferences (Alone, With peers, Tutoring). Let $O_{ij}$ denote the observed frequency in row $i$ (preference) and column $j$ (group).

The observed frequencies are as follows:

Preference	Group 1	Group 2	Row total
Alone	12	8	20
With peers	18	22	40
Tutoring	10	30	40
Column total	40	60	100

Under the null hypothesis $H_0$, the rows are proportional across groups.

The expected frequencies are computed using:

$E_{ij} = \frac{R_i \cdot C_j}{T},$

where $R_i$ is the row total, $C_j$ is the column total, and $T$ is the grand total.

For example, for the first row and first column:

$E_{11} = \frac{20 \cdot 40}{100} = 8.$

The expected frequencies are:

Preference	Group 1	Group 2
Alone	8	12
With peers	16	24
Tutoring	16	24

The Pearson chi-squared statistic is then:

$\chi^2_{\text{stat}} = \sum_{i=1}^{3} \sum_{j=1}^{2} \frac{(O_{ij}-E_{ij})^2}{E_{ij}} = 7.5.$

With $(3-1)(2-1) = 2$ degrees of freedom, this value can be compared to the chi-squared distribution to test the null hypothesis.

== Pitfalls of the test ==
The approximation to the chi-squared distribution breaks down if expected frequencies are too low.

It will normally be acceptable so long as no more than 20% of the events have expected frequencies below 5. Where there is only 1 degree of freedom, the approximation is not reliable if expected frequencies are below 10. In this case, a better approximation can be obtained by reducing the absolute value of each difference between observed and expected frequencies by 0.5 before squaring; this is called Yates's correction for continuity.

In cases where the expected value, E, is found to be small (indicating a small underlying population probability, and/or a small number of observations), the normal approximation of the multinomial distribution can fail, and in such cases it is found to be more appropriate to use the G-test, a likelihood ratio-based test statistic. When the total sample size is small, it is necessary to use an appropriate exact test, typically either the binomial test or, for contingency tables, Fisher's exact test. This test uses the conditional distribution of the test statistic given the marginal totals, and thus assumes that the margins were determined before the study; alternatives such as Boschloo's test which do not make this assumption are uniformly more powerful.

In Pearson's test of homogeneity, if all entries of a matrix $A$ are multiplied by a positive constant $c$, the Pearson chi-squared statistic is also multiplied by $c$:

$\chi^2_{\text{stat}}(cA) = c \chi^2_{\text{stat}}(A).$

Therefore, if all rows of $A$ are exactly proportional,

$\chi^2_{\text{stat}}(cA) = c \chi^2_{\text{stat}}(A) = 0$

for any $c$ and any significance level $\alpha$. Otherwise, $\chi^2_{\text{stat}}(cA)$ can become arbitrarily large or small as $c$ increases or decreases. Hence, at a fixed significance level $\alpha$, the null hypothesis $H_0$ will be rejected with confidence $1-\alpha$ when $c$ is sufficiently large, and not rejected when $c$ is sufficiently small. That is, the chi-squared statistic increases linearly when the entire contingency table is multiplied by a constant factor, reflecting the proportional scaling of observed and expected frequencies.

It can be shown that the $\chi^2$ test is a low order approximation of the $\Psi$ test. The above reasons for the above issues become apparent when the higher order terms are investigated.

== See also ==
- Chi-squared nomogram
- Cramér's V – a measure of correlation for the chi-squared test
- Degrees of freedom (statistics)
- Deviance (statistics), another measure of the quality of fit
- Fisher's exact test
- G-test, test to which chi-squared test is an approximation
- Lexis ratio, earlier statistic, replaced by chi-squared
- Mann–Whitney U test
- Median test
- Minimum chi-square estimation
- Reduced chi-squared statistic
- Two-proportion Z-test
