= Brent Coull =

American statistician

- Education: University of Florida
- Scientific career
- Thesis: Subject-Specific Modelling of Capture-Recapture Experiments (1997)
- Doctoral advisor: Alan Agresti
- Doctoral students: Loni Tabb
- Website: www.hsph.harvard.edu/brent-coull/

Brent Andrew Coull is an American statistician and Professor of Biostatistics at Harvard University.

== Biography ==
He received his Ph.D. in Statistics from the University of Florida in 1997. His thesis advisor was Alan Agresti. He and his advisor came up with the Agresti–Coull interval, an approximate method for calculating binomial confidence intervals.

== Honors and awards ==
He was named a fellow of the American Statistical Association in 2010.
