= Le Cam's theorem =

Probability theorem

In probability theory, Le Cam's theorem, named after Lucien Le Cam, states the following.

Suppose:

- $X_1, X_2, X_3, \ldots$ are independent random variables, each with a Bernoulli distribution (i.e., equal to either 0 or 1), not necessarily identically distributed.
- $\Pr(X_i = 1) = p_i, \text{ for } i = 1, 2, 3, \ldots.$
- $\lambda_n = p_1 + \cdots + p_n.$
- $S_n = X_1 + \cdots + X_n.$ (i.e. $S_n$ follows a Poisson binomial distribution)

Then

$$\frac12\sum_{k=0}^\infty \left| \Pr(S_n=k) - {\lambda_n^k e^{-\lambda_n} \over k!} \right| < \sum_{i=1}^n p_i^2.$$

The left hand side here is the total variation distance.

In other words, the sum has approximately a Poisson distribution, and the approximation error (written as the total variation distance) is bounded by the above inequality.

By setting p_{i} = λ_{n}/n, we see that this generalizes the usual Poisson limit theorem.

When $\lambda_n$ is large a better bound is possible:^{[Theorem 1 of ]}

$$\frac12\sum_{k=0}^\infty \left| \Pr(S_n=k) - {\lambda_n^k e^{-\lambda_n} \over k!} \right| \le {1-e^{-\lambda_n}\over\lambda_n}\sum_{i=1}^n p_i^2.$$

Lower bounds have also been proven:^{[Theorem 2 of ]}

$$\frac12\sum_{k=0}^\infty \left| \Pr(S_n=k) - {\lambda_n^k e^{-\lambda_n} \over k!} \right| \ge \frac1{32}\left(1 \wedge \frac 1 \lambda_n\right) \left( \sum_{i=1}^n p_i^2 \right),$$

where $\wedge$ represents the $\min$ operator.

It is also possible to weaken the independence requirement.
