= Poisson limit theorem =

Probability Theory

Comparison of the Poisson distribution (black lines) and the binomial distribution with n = 10 (red circles), n = 20 (blue circles), n = 1000 (green circles). All distributions have a mean of 5. The horizontal axis shows the number of events k. As n gets larger, the Poisson distribution becomes an increasingly better approximation for the binomial distribution with the same mean.

In probability theory, the law of rare events or Poisson limit theorem states that the Poisson distribution may be used as an approximation to the binomial distribution, under certain conditions. The theorem was named after Siméon Denis Poisson (1781–1840). A generalization of this theorem is Le Cam's theorem.

== Theorem ==
Let $p_n$ be a sequence of real numbers in $[0,1]$ such that the sequence $n p_n$ converges to a finite limit $\lambda$. Then:

$$\lim_{n\to \infty} {n \choose k} p_n^k (1-p_n)^{n-k} = e^{-\lambda}\frac{\lambda^k}{k!}$$

== First proof ==
Assume $\lambda > 0$ (the case $\lambda = 0$ is easier). Then

$$\begin{align}
\lim\limits_{n\rightarrow\infty}{n \choose k} p_n^k (1-p_n)^{n-k}
&= \lim_{n\to\infty}\frac{n(n-1)(n-2)\dots(n-k+1)}{k!} \left(\frac{\lambda}{n}(1+o(1))\right)^k \left(1- \frac{\lambda}{n}(1+o(1))\right)^{n-k} \\
&= \lim_{n\to\infty}\frac{n^k+O\left(n^{k-1}\right)}{k!} \frac{\lambda^k}{n^k} \left(1- \frac{\lambda}{n}(1+o(1))\right)^{n} \left(1- \frac{\lambda}{n}(1+o(1))\right)^{-k}\\
&= \lim_{n\to\infty}\frac{\lambda^k}{k!} \left(1-\frac{\lambda}{n}(1+o(1))\right)^{n}.
\end{align}$$

Since

$$\lim_{n\to\infty} \left(1-\frac{\lambda}{n}(1+o(1))\right)^{n} = e^{-\lambda}$$

this leaves

$${n \choose k}p^k (1-p)^{n-k} \simeq \frac{\lambda^k e^{-\lambda}}{k!}.$$

=== Alternative proof ===
Using Stirling's approximation, it can be written:

$$\begin{align}
{n \choose k}p^k (1-p)^{n-k}
&= \frac{n!}{(n-k)!k!} p^k (1-p)^{n-k}
\\ &\simeq \frac{ \sqrt{2\pi n}\left(\frac{n}{e}\right)^n}{ \sqrt{2\pi \left(n-k\right)}\left(\frac{n-k}{e}\right)^{n-k}k!} p^k (1-p)^{n-k}
\\ &= \sqrt{\frac{n}{n-k}}\frac{n^n e^{-k}}{\left(n-k\right)^{n-k}k!}p^k (1-p)^{n-k}.
\end{align}$$

Letting $n \to \infty$ and $np = \lambda$:

$$\begin{align}
{n \choose k}p^k (1-p)^{n-k}
&\simeq \frac{n^n\,p^k (1-p)^{n-k}e^{-k}}{\left(n-k\right)^{n-k}k!}
\\&= \frac{n^n\left(\frac{\lambda}{n}\right)^k \left(1-\frac{\lambda}{n}\right)^{n-k}e^{-k}}{n^{n-k}\left(1-\frac{k}{n}\right)^{n-k}k!} \\&= \frac{\lambda^k \left(1-\frac{\lambda}{n}\right)^{n-k}e^{-k}}{\left(1-\frac{k}{n}\right)^{n-k}k!}
\\ &\simeq \frac{\lambda^k \left(1-\frac{\lambda}{n}\right)^{n}e^{-k}}{\left(1-\frac{k}{n}\right)^{n}k!} .
\end{align}$$

As $n \to \infty$, $\left(1-\frac{x}{n}\right)^n \to e^{-x}$ so:

$$\begin{align}
{n \choose k}p^k (1-p)^{n-k}
&\simeq \frac{\lambda^k e^{-\lambda}e^{-k}}{e^{-k}k!}
\\&= \frac{\lambda^k e^{-\lambda}}{k!}
\end{align}$$

=== Ordinary generating functions ===
It is also possible to demonstrate the theorem through the use of ordinary generating functions of the binomial distribution:

$$G_\operatorname{bin}(x;p,N)
\equiv \sum_{k=0}^N \left[ \binom{N}{k} p^k (1-p)^{N-k} \right] x^k
= \Big[ 1 + (x-1)p \Big]^N$$

by virtue of the binomial theorem. Taking the limit $N \rightarrow \infty$ while keeping the product $pN\equiv\lambda$ constant, it can be seen:

$$\lim_{N\rightarrow\infty} G_\operatorname{bin}(x;p,N)
= \lim_{N\rightarrow\infty} \left[ 1 + \frac{\lambda(x-1)}{N} \right]^N
= \mathrm{e}^{\lambda(x-1)}
= \sum_{k=0}^{\infty} \left[ \frac{\mathrm{e}^{-\lambda}\lambda^k}{k!} \right] x^k$$

which is the OGF for the Poisson distribution. (The second equality holds due to the definition of the exponential function.)

== See also ==
- De Moivre–Laplace theorem
- Le Cam's theorem
