= List of statistics articles =

== 0–9 ==
- 1.96
- 2SLS (two-stage least squares) – redirects to instrumental variable
- 3SLS – see three-stage least squares
- 68–95–99.7 rule
- 100-year flood

== A ==
- A priori probability
- Abductive reasoning
- Absolute deviation
- Absolute risk reduction
- Absorbing Markov chain
- ABX test
- Accelerated failure time model
- Acceptable quality limit
- Acceptance sampling
- Accidental sampling
- Accuracy and precision
- Accuracy paradox
- Acquiescence bias
- Actuarial science
- Adapted process
- Adaptive estimator
- Additive Markov chain
- Additive model
- Additive smoothing
- Additive white Gaussian noise
- Adjusted Rand index – see Rand index (subsection)
- ADMB – software
- Admissible decision rule
- Age adjustment
- Age-standardized mortality rate
- Age stratification
- Aggregate data
- Aggregate pattern
- Akaike information criterion
- Algebra of random variables
- Algebraic statistics
- Algorithmic inference
- Algorithms for calculating variance
- All models are wrong
- All-pairs testing
- Allan variance
- Alignments of random points
- Almost surely
- Alpha beta filter
- Alternative hypothesis
- Analyse-it – software
- Analysis of categorical data
- Analysis of covariance
- Analysis of molecular variance
- Analysis of rhythmic variance
- Analysis of variance
- Analytic and enumerative statistical studies
- Ancestral graph
- Anchor test
- Ancillary statistic
- ANCOVA – redirects to Analysis of covariance
- Anderson–Darling test
- ANOVA
- ANOVA on ranks
- ANOVA–simultaneous component analysis
- Anomaly detection
- Anomaly time series
- Anscombe transform
- Anscombe's quartet
- Antecedent variable
- Antithetic variates
- Approximate Bayesian computation
- Approximate entropy
- Arcsine distribution
- Area chart
- Area compatibility factor
- ARGUS distribution
- Arithmetic mean
- Armitage–Doll multistage model of carcinogenesis
- Arrival theorem
- Artificial neural network
- Ascertainment bias
- ASReml – software
- Association (statistics)
- Association mapping
- Association scheme
- Assumed mean
- Astrostatistics
- Asymptotic distribution
- Asymptotic equipartition property (information theory)
- Asymptotic normality – redirects to Asymptotic distribution
- Asymptotic relative efficiency – redirects to Efficiency (statistics)
- Asymptotic theory (statistics)
- Atkinson index
- Attack rate
- Augmented Dickey–Fuller test
- Aumann's agreement theorem
- Autocorrelation
  - Autocorrelation plot – redirects to Correlogram
- Autocovariance
- Autoregressive conditional duration
- Autoregressive conditional heteroskedasticity
- Autoregressive fractionally integrated moving average
- Autoregressive integrated moving average
- Autoregressive model
- Autoregressive–moving-average model
- Auxiliary particle filter
- Average
- Average treatment effect
- Averaged one-dependence estimators
- Azuma's inequality

== B ==
- BA model – model for a random network
- Backfitting algorithm
- Balance equation
- Balanced incomplete block design – redirects to Block design
- Balanced repeated replication
- Balding–Nichols model
- Banburismus – related to Bayesian networks
- Bangdiwala's B
- Bapat–Beg theorem
- Bar chart
- Barabási–Albert model
- Barber–Johnson diagram
- Barnard's test
- Barnardisation
- Barnes interpolation
- Bartlett's method
- Bartlett's test
- Bartlett's theorem
- Base rate
- Baseball statistics
- Basu's theorem
- Bates distribution
- Baum–Welch algorithm
- Bayes classifier
- Bayes error rate
- Bayes estimator
- Bayes factor
- Bayes linear statistics
- Bayes' rule
- Bayes' theorem
  - Evidence under Bayes theorem
- Bayesian – disambiguation
- Bayesian average
- Bayesian brain
- Bayesian econometrics
- Bayesian experimental design
- Bayesian game
- Bayesian inference
- Bayesian inference in marketing
- Bayesian inference in phylogeny
- Bayesian inference using Gibbs sampling
- Bayesian information criterion
- Bayesian linear regression
- Bayesian model comparison – see Bayes factor
- Bayesian multivariate linear regression
- Bayesian network
- Bayesian probability
- Bayesian search theory
- Bayesian spam filtering
- Bayesian statistics
- Bayesian tool for methylation analysis
- Bayesian vector autoregression
- BCMP network – queueing theory
- Bean machine
- Behrens–Fisher distribution
- Behrens–Fisher problem
- Belief propagation
- Belt transect
- Benford's law
- Benini distribution
- Bennett's inequality
- Berkson error model
- Berkson's paradox
- Berlin procedure
- Bernoulli distribution
- Bernoulli process
- Bernoulli sampling
- Bernoulli scheme
- Bernoulli trial
- Bernstein inequalities (probability theory)
- Bernstein–von Mises theorem
- Berry–Esseen theorem
- Bertrand's ballot theorem
- Bertrand's box paradox
- Bessel process
- Bessel's correction
- Best linear unbiased prediction
- Beta (finance)
- Beta-binomial distribution
- Beta-binomial model
- Beta distribution
- Beta function – for incomplete beta function
- Beta negative binomial distribution
- Beta prime distribution
- Beta rectangular distribution
- Beverton–Holt model
- Bhatia–Davis inequality
- Bhattacharya coefficient – redirects to Bhattacharyya distance
- Bias (statistics)
- Bias of an estimator
- Biased random walk (biochemistry)
- Biased sample – see Sampling bias
- Biclustering
- Big O in probability notation
- Bienaymé–Chebyshev inequality
- Bills of Mortality
- Bimodal distribution
- Binary classification
- Bingham distribution
- Binomial distribution
- Binomial proportion confidence interval
- Binomial regression
- Binomial test
- Bioinformatics
- Biometrics (statistics) – redirects to Biostatistics
- Biostatistics
- Biplot
- Birnbaum–Saunders distribution
- Birth–death process
- Biserial correlation
- Bispectrum
- Bivariate analysis
- Bivariate von Mises distribution
- Black–Scholes
- Bland–Altman plot
- Blind deconvolution
- Blind experiment
- Block design
- Blocking (statistics)
- Blumenthal's zero–one law
- BMDP – software
- Bochner's theorem
- Bonferroni correction
- Bonferroni inequalities – redirects to Boole's inequality
- Boole's inequality
- Boolean analysis
- Bootstrap aggregating
- Bootstrap error-adjusted single-sample technique
- Bootstrapping (statistics)
- Bootstrapping populations
- Borel–Cantelli lemma
- Bose–Mesner algebra
- Box–Behnken design
- Box–Cox distribution
- Box–Cox transformation – redirects to Power transform
- Box–Jenkins
- Box–Muller transform
- Box–Pierce test
- Box plot
- Branching process
- Bregman divergence
- Breusch–Godfrey test
- Breusch–Pagan statistic – redirects to Breusch–Pagan test
- Breusch–Pagan test
- Brown–Forsythe test
- Brownian bridge
- Brownian excursion
- Brownian motion
- Brownian tree
- Bruck–Ryser–Chowla theorem
- Burke's theorem
- Burr distribution
- Business statistics
- Bühlmann model
- Buzen's algorithm
- BV4.1 (software)

== C ==
- c-chart
- Càdlàg
- Calculating demand forecast accuracy
- Calculus of predispositions
- Calibrated probability assessment
- Calibration (probability) – subjective probability, redirects to Calibrated probability assessment
- Calibration (statistics) – the statistical calibration problem
- Cancer cluster
- Canonical analysis
- Canonical correlation
- Canopy clustering algorithm
- Cantor distribution
- Carpet plot
- Cartogram
- Case-control – redirects to Case-control study
- Case-control study
- Catastro of Ensenada – a census of part of Spain
- Categorical data
- Categorical distribution
- Categorical variable
- Cauchy distribution
- Cauchy–Schwarz inequality
- Causal Markov condition
- CDF-based nonparametric confidence interval
- Ceiling effect (statistics)
- Cellular noise
- Censored regression model
- Censoring (clinical trials)
- Censoring (statistics)
- Centering matrix
- Centerpoint (geometry) – to which Tukey median redirects
- Central composite design
- Central limit theorem
  - Central limit theorem (illustration) – redirects to Illustration of the central limit theorem
  - Central limit theorem for directional statistics
  - Lyapunov's central limit theorem
  - Martingale central limit theorem
- Central moment
- Central tendency
- Census
- Cepstrum
- CHAID – CHi-squared Automatic Interaction Detector
- Chain rule for Kolmogorov complexity
- Challenge–dechallenge–rechallenge
- Champernowne distribution
- Change detection
  - Change detection (GIS)
- Chapman–Kolmogorov equation
- Chapman–Robbins bound
- Characteristic function (probability theory)
- Chauvenet's criterion
- Chebyshev center
- Chebyshev's inequality
- Checking if a coin is biased – redirects to Checking whether a coin is fair
- Checking whether a coin is fair
- Cheeger bound
- Chemometrics
- Chernoff bound – a special case of Chernoff's inequality
- Chernoff face
- Chernoff's distribution
- Chernoff's inequality
- Chi distribution
- Chi-squared distribution
- Chi-squared test
- Chinese restaurant process
- Choropleth map
- Chow test
- Chronux software
- Circular analysis
- Circular distribution
- Circular error probable
- Circular statistics – redirects to Directional statistics
- Circular uniform distribution
- Civic statistics
- Clark–Ocone theorem
- Class membership probabilities
- Classic data sets
- Classical definition of probability
- Classical test theory – psychometrics
- Classification rule
- Classifier (mathematics)
- Climate ensemble
- Climograph
- Clinical significance
- Clinical study design
- Clinical trial
- Clinical utility of diagnostic tests
- Cliodynamics
- Closed testing procedure
- Cluster analysis
- Cluster randomised controlled trial
- Cluster sampling
- Cluster-weighted modeling
- Clustering high-dimensional data
- CMA-ES (Covariance Matrix Adaptation Evolution Strategy)
- Coalescent theory
- Cochran's C test
- Cochran's Q test
- Cochran's theorem
- Cochran–Armitage test for trend
- Cochran–Mantel–Haenszel statistics
- Cochrane–Orcutt estimation
- Coding (social sciences)
- Coefficient of coherence – redirects to Coherence (statistics)
- Coefficient of colligation
- Coefficient of determination
- Coefficient of dispersion
- Coefficient of variation
- Cognitive pretesting
- Cohen's class distribution function – a time-frequency distribution function
- Cohen's h
- Cohen's kappa
- Coherence (signal processing)
- Coherence (statistics)
- Cohort (statistics)
- Cohort effect
- Cohort study
- Cointegration
- Collectively exhaustive events
- Collider (statistics)
- Combinatorial data analysis
- Combinatorial design
- Combinatorial meta-analysis
- Common-method variance
- Common mode failure
- Common cause and special cause (statistics)
- Comonotonicity
- Comparing means
- Comparison of general and generalized linear models
- Comparison of statistical packages
- Comparisonwise error rate
- Complementary event
- Complete-linkage clustering
- Complete spatial randomness
- Completely randomized design
- Completeness (statistics)
- Compositional data
- Composite bar chart
- Compound Poisson distribution
- Compound Poisson process
- Compound probability distribution
- Computational formula for the variance
- Computational learning theory
- Computational statistics
- Computer experiment
- Computer-assisted survey information collection
- Concomitant (statistics)
- Concordance correlation coefficient
- Concordant pair
- Concrete illustration of the central limit theorem
- Concurrent validity
- Conditional change model
- Conditional distribution – see Conditional probability distribution
- Conditional dependence
- Conditional expectation
- Conditional independence
- Conditional probability
- Conditional probability distribution
- Conditional random field
- Conditional variance
- Conditionality principle
- Confidence band – redirects to Confidence and prediction bands
- Confidence distribution
- Confidence interval
- Confidence region
- Configural frequency analysis
- Confirmation bias
- Confirmatory factor analysis
- Confounding
- Confounding factor
- Confusion of the inverse
- Congruence coefficient
- Conjoint analysis
  - Conjoint analysis (in healthcare)
  - Conjoint analysis (in marketing)
- Conjugate prior
- Consensus-based assessment
- Consensus clustering
- Consensus forecast
- Conservatism (belief revision)
- Consistency (statistics)
- Consistent estimator
- Constant elasticity of substitution
- Constant false alarm rate
- Constraint (information theory)
- Consumption distribution
- Contact process (mathematics)
- Content validity
- Contiguity (probability theory)
- Contingency table
- Continuity correction
- Continuous distribution – see Continuous probability distribution
- Continuous mapping theorem
- Continuous probability distribution
- Continuous stochastic process
- Continuous-time Markov process
- Continuous-time stochastic process
- Contrast (statistics)
- Control chart
- Control event rate
- Control limits
- Control variate
- Controlling for a variable
- Convergence of measures
- Convergence of random variables
- Convex hull
- Convolution of probability distributions
- Convolution random number generator
- Conway–Maxwell–Poisson distribution
- Cook's distance
- Cophenetic correlation
- Copula (statistics)
- Cornish–Fisher expansion
- Correct sampling
- Correction for attenuation
- Correlation
- Correlation and dependence
- Correlation does not imply causation
- Correlation clustering
- Correlation function
  - Correlation function (astronomy)
  - Correlation function (quantum field theory)
  - Correlation function (statistical mechanics)
- Correlation inequality
- Correlation ratio
- Correlogram
- Correspondence analysis
- Cosmic variance
- Cost-of-living index
- Count data
- Counternull
- Counting process
- Covariance
- Covariance and correlation
- Covariance intersection
- Covariance matrix
- Covariance function
- Covariate
- Cover's theorem
- Coverage probability
- Cox process
- Cox's theorem
- Cox–Ingersoll–Ross model
- Cramér–Rao bound
- Cramér–von Mises criterion
- Cramér's decomposition theorem
- Cramér's theorem (large deviations)
- Cramér's V
- Craps principle
- Credal set
- Credible interval
- Cricket statistics
- Crime statistics
- Critical region – redirects to Statistical hypothesis testing
- Cromwell's rule
- Cronbach's α
- Cross-correlation
- Cross-covariance
- Cross-entropy method
- Cross-sectional data
- Cross-sectional regression
- Cross-sectional study
- Cross-spectrum
- Cross tabulation
- Cross-validation (statistics)
- Crossover study
- Crystal Ball function – a probability distribution
- Cucconi test
- Cumulant
- Cumulant generating function – redirects to cumulant
- Cumulative accuracy profile
- Cumulative distribution function
- Cumulative frequency analysis
- Cumulative incidence
- Cunningham function
- CURE data clustering algorithm
- Curve fitting
- CUSUM
- Cuzick–Edwards test
- Cyclostationary process

== D ==
- d-separation
- D/M/1 queue
- D'Agostino's K-squared test
- Dagum distribution
- DAP – open source software
- Data analysis
- Data assimilation
- Data binning
- Data classification (business intelligence)
- Data cleansing
- Data clustering
- Data collection
- Data Desk – software
- Data dredging
- Data fusion
- Data generating process
- Data mining
- Data reduction
- Data point
- Data quality assurance
- Data set
- Data-snooping bias
- Data stream clustering
- Data transformation (statistics)
- Data visualization
- DataDetective – software
- Dataplot – software
- Davies–Bouldin index
- Davis distribution
- De Finetti's game
- De Finetti's theorem
- DeFries–Fulker regression
- de Moivre's law
- De Moivre–Laplace theorem
- Decision boundary
- Decision theory
- Decomposition of time series
- Degenerate distribution
- Degrees of freedom (statistics)
- Delaporte distribution
- Delphi method
- Delta method
- Demand forecasting
- Deming regression
- Demographics
- Demography
  - Demographic statistics
- Dendrogram
- Density estimation
- Dependent and independent variables
- Descriptive research
- Descriptive statistics
- Design effect
- Design matrix
- Design of experiments
  - The Design of Experiments (book by Fisher)
- Detailed balance
- Detection theory
- Determining the number of clusters in a data set
- Detrended correspondence analysis
- Detrended fluctuation analysis
- Deviance (statistics)
- Deviance information criterion
- Deviation (statistics)
- DFFITS – a regression diagnostic
- Diagnostic odds ratio
- Dickey–Fuller test
- Difference in differences
- Differential entropy
- Diffusion process
- Diffusion-limited aggregation
- Digby's H
- Dimension reduction
- Dilution assay
- Direct relationship
- Directional statistics
- Dirichlet distribution
- Dirichlet-multinomial distribution
- Dirichlet process
- Disattenuation
- Discrepancy function
- Discrete choice
- Discrete choice analysis
- Discrete distribution – redirects to section of Probability distribution
- Discrete frequency domain
- Discrete phase-type distribution
- Discrete probability distribution – redirects to section of Probability distribution
- Discrete time
- Discretization of continuous features
- Discriminant function analysis
- Discriminative model
- Disorder problem
- Distance correlation
- Distance sampling
- Distributed lag
- Distribution fitting
- Divergence (statistics)
- Diversity index
- Divisia index
- Divisia monetary aggregates index
- Dixon's Q test
- Dominating decision rule
- Donsker's theorem
- Doob decomposition theorem
- Doob martingale
- Doob's martingale convergence theorems
- Doob's martingale inequality
- Doob–Meyer decomposition theorem
- Doomsday argument
- Dot plot (bioinformatics)
- Dot plot (statistics)
- Double counting (fallacy)
- Double descent
- Double exponential distribution (disambiguation)
- Double mass analysis
- Doubly stochastic model
- Drift rate – redirects to Stochastic drift
- Dudley's theorem
- Dummy variable (statistics)
- Duncan's new multiple range test
- Dunn index
- Dunnett's test
- Durbin test
- Durbin–Watson statistic
- Dutch book
- Dvoretzky–Kiefer–Wolfowitz inequality
- Dyadic distribution
- Dynamic Bayesian network
- Dynamic factor
- Dynamic topic model

== E ==
- E-statistic
- Earth mover's distance
- Eaton's inequality
- Ecological correlation
- Ecological fallacy
- Ecological regression
- Ecological study
- Econometrics
- Econometric model
- Econometric software – redirects to Comparison of statistical packages
- Economic data
- Economic epidemiology
- Economic statistics
- Eddy covariance
- Edgeworth series
- Effect size
- Efficiency (statistics)
- Efficient estimator
- Ehrenfest model
- Elastic map
- Elliptical distribution
- Ellsberg paradox
- Elston–Stewart algorithm
- EMG distribution
- Empirical
- Empirical Bayes method
- Empirical distribution function
- Empirical likelihood
- Empirical measure
- Empirical orthogonal functions
- Empirical probability
- Empirical process
- Empirical statistical laws
- Endogeneity (econometrics)
- End point of clinical trials
- Energy distance
- Energy statistics (disambiguation)
- Encyclopedia of Statistical Sciences (book)
- Engelbert–Schmidt zero–one law
- Engineering statistics
- Engineering tolerance
- Engset calculation
- Ensemble forecasting
- Ensemble Kalman filter
- Entropy (information theory)
- Entropy estimation
- Entropy power inequality
- Environmental statistics
- Epi Info – software
- Epidata – software
- Epidemic model
- Epidemiological methods
- Epilogism
- Epitome (image processing)
- Epps effect
- Equating – test equating
- Equipossible
- Equiprobable
- Erdős–Rényi model
- Erlang distribution
- Ergodic theory
- Ergodicity
- Error bar
- Error correction model
- Error function
- Errors and residuals in statistics
- Errors-in-variables models
- An Essay Towards Solving a Problem in the Doctrine of Chances
- Estimating equations
- Estimation theory
- Estimation of covariance matrices
- Estimation of signal parameters via rotational invariance techniques
- Estimator
- Etemadi's inequality
- Ethical problems using children in clinical trials
- Event (probability theory)
- Event study
- Evidence lower bound
- Evidence under Bayes theorem
- Evolutionary data mining
- Ewens's sampling formula
- EWMA chart
- Exact statistics
- Exact test
- Examples of Markov chains
- Excess risk
- Exchange paradox
- Exchangeable random variables
- Expander walk sampling
- Expectation–maximization algorithm
- Expectation propagation
- Expected mean squares
- Expected utility hypothesis
- Expected value
- Expected value of sample information
- Experiment
- Experimental design diagram
- Experimental event rate
- Experimental uncertainty analysis
- Experimenter's bias
- Experimentwise error rate
- Explained sum of squares
- Explained variation
- Explanatory variable
- Exploratory data analysis
- Exploratory factor analysis
- Exponential dispersion model
- Exponential distribution
- Exponential family
- Exponential-logarithmic distribution
- Exponential power distribution – redirects to Generalized normal distribution
- Exponential random numbers – redirect to subsection of Exponential distribution
- Exponential smoothing
- Exponentially modified Gaussian distribution
- Exponentiated Weibull distribution
- Exposure variable
- Extended Kalman filter
- Extended negative binomial distribution
- Extensions of Fisher's method
- External validity
- Extrapolation domain analysis
- Extreme value theory
- Extremum estimator

== F ==
- F-distribution
- F-divergence
- F-statistics – population genetics
- F-test
- F-test of equality of variances
- F1 score
- Facet theory
- Factor analysis
- Factor regression model
- Factor graph
- Factorial code
- Factorial experiment
- Factorial moment
- Factorial moment generating function
- Failure rate
- Fair coin
- Falconer's formula
- False confidence theorem
- False discovery rate
- False nearest neighbor algorithm
- False negative
- False positive
- False positive rate
- False positive paradox
- Family-wise error rate
- Fan chart (time series)
- Fano factor
- Fast Fourier transform
- Fast Kalman filter
- FastICA – fast independent component analysis
- Fat-tailed distribution
- Feasible generalized least squares
- Feature extraction
- Feller process
- Feller's coin-tossing constants
- Feller-continuous process
- Felsenstein's tree-pruning algorithm – statistical genetics
- Fides (reliability)
- Fiducial inference
- Field experiment
- Fieller's theorem
- File drawer problem
- Filtering problem (stochastic processes)
- Financial econometrics
- Financial models with long-tailed distributions and volatility clustering
- Finite-dimensional distribution
- First-hitting-time model
- First-in-man study
- Fishburn–Shepp inequality
- Fisher consistency
- Fisher information
- Fisher information metric
- Fisher kernel
- Fisher transformation
- Fisher's exact test
- Fisher's inequality
- Fisher's linear discriminator
- Fisher's method
- Fisher's noncentral hypergeometric distribution
- Fisher's z-distribution
- Fisher–Tippett distribution – redirects to Generalized extreme value distribution
- Fisher–Tippett–Gnedenko theorem
- Five-number summary
- Fixed effects estimator and Fixed effects estimation – redirect to Fixed effects model
- Fixed-effect Poisson model
- FLAME clustering
- Fleiss' kappa
- Fleming–Viot process
- Flood risk assessment
- Floor effect
- Focused information criterion
- Fokker–Planck equation
- Folded normal distribution
- Forecast bias
- Forecast error
- Forecast skill
- Forecasting
- Forest plot
- Fork-join queue
- Formation matrix
- Forward measure
- Foster's theorem
- Foundations of statistics
- Founders of statistics
- Fourier analysis
- Fowlkes–Mallows index
- Fraction of variance unexplained
- Fractional Brownian motion
- Fractional factorial design
- Fréchet distribution
- Fréchet mean
- Freedman's paradox
- Freedman–Diaconis rule
- Freidlin–Wentzell theorem
- Frequency (statistics)
- Frequency distribution
- Frequency domain
- Frequency probability
- Frequentist inference
- Friedman test
- Friendship paradox
- Frisch–Waugh–Lovell theorem
- Fully crossed design
- Function approximation
- Functional boxplot
- Functional data analysis
- Funnel plot
- Fuzzy logic
- Fuzzy measure theory
- FWL theorem – relating regression and projection

== G ==
- G/G/1 queue
- G-network
- G-test
- Galbraith plot
- Gallagher Index
- Galton–Watson process
- Galton's problem
- Gambler's fallacy
- Gambler's ruin
- Gambling and information theory
- Game of chance
- Gamma distribution
- Gamma test (statistics)
- Gamma process
- Gamma variate
- GAUSS (software)
- Gauss's inequality
- Gauss–Kuzmin distribution
- Gauss–Markov process
- Gauss–Markov theorem
- Gauss–Newton algorithm
- Gaussian function
- Gaussian isoperimetric inequality
- Gaussian measure
- Gaussian noise
- Gaussian process
- Gaussian process emulator
- Gaussian q-distribution
- Geary's C
- GEH statistic – a statistic comparing modelled and observed counts
- General linear model
- Generalizability theory
- Generalized additive model
- Generalized additive model for location, scale and shape
- Generalized beta distribution
- Generalized canonical correlation
- Generalized chi-squared distribution
- Generalized Dirichlet distribution
- Generalized entropy index
- Generalized estimating equation
- Generalized expected utility
- Generalized extreme value distribution
- Generalized gamma distribution
- Generalized Gaussian distribution
- Generalised hyperbolic distribution
- Generalized inverse Gaussian distribution
- Generalized least squares
- Generalized linear array model
- Generalized linear mixed model
- Generalized linear model
- Generalized logistic distribution
- Generalized method of moments
- Generalized multidimensional scaling
- Generalized multivariate log-gamma distribution
- Generalized normal distribution
- Generalized p-value
- Generalized Pareto distribution
- Generalized Procrustes analysis
- Generalized randomized block design
- Generalized Tobit
- Generalized Wiener process
- Generative model
- Genetic epidemiology
- GenStat – software
- Geo-imputation
- Geodemographic segmentation
- Geometric Brownian motion
- Geometric data analysis
- Geometric distribution
- Geometric median
- Geometric standard deviation
- Geometric stable distribution
- Geospatial predictive modeling
- Geostatistics
- German tank problem
- Gerschenkron effect
- Gibbs sampling
- Gillespie algorithm
- Gini coefficient
- Girsanov theorem
- Gittins index
- GLIM (software) – software
- Glivenko–Cantelli theorem
- GLUE (uncertainty assessment)
- Goldfeld–Quandt test
- Gompertz distribution
- Gompertz function
- Gompertz–Makeham law of mortality
- Good–Turing frequency estimation
- Goodhart's law
- Goodman and Kruskal's gamma
- Goodman and Kruskal's lambda
- Goodness of fit
- Gordon–Newell network
- Gordon–Newell theorem
- Graeco-Latin square
- Grand mean
- Granger causality
- Graph cuts in computer vision – a potential application of Bayesian analysis
- Graphical model
- Graphical models for protein structure
- GraphPad InStat – software
- GraphPad Prism – software
- Gravity model of trade
- Greenwood statistic
- Gretl
- Group family
- Group method of data handling
- Group size measures
- Grouped data
- Grubbs's test for outliers
- Guess value
- Guesstimate
- Gumbel distribution
- Guttman scale
- Gy's sampling theory

== H ==
- h-index
- Hájek–Le Cam convolution theorem
- Half circle distribution
- Half-logistic distribution
- Half-normal distribution
- Halton sequence
- Hamburger moment problem
- Hannan–Quinn information criterion
- Harris chain
- Hardy–Weinberg principle – statistical genetics
- Hartley's test
- Hat matrix
- Hammersley–Clifford theorem
- Hausdorff moment problem
- Hausman specification test – redirects to Hausman test
- Haybittle–Peto boundary
- Hazard function – redirects to Failure rate
- Hazard ratio
- Heaps' law
- Health care analytics
- Heart rate variability
- Heavy-tailed distribution
- Heckman correction
- Hedonic regression
- Hellin's law
- Hellinger distance
- Helmert–Wolf blocking
- Herdan's law
- Herfindahl index
- Heston model
- Heteroscedasticity
- Heteroscedasticity-consistent standard errors
- Heteroskedasticity – see Heteroscedasticity
- Hewitt–Savage zero–one law
- Hidden Markov model
- Hidden Markov random field
- Hidden semi-Markov model
- Hierarchical Bayes model
- Hierarchical clustering
- Hierarchical hidden Markov model
- Hierarchical linear modeling
- High-dimensional statistics
- Higher-order factor analysis
- Higher-order statistics
- Hirschman uncertainty
- Histogram
- Historiometry
- History of randomness
- History of statistics
- Hitting time
- Hodges' estimator
- Hodges–Lehmann estimator
- Hoeffding's independence test
- Hoeffding's lemma
- Hoeffding's inequality
- Holm–Bonferroni method
- Holtsmark distribution
- Homogeneity (statistics)
- Homogenization (climate)
- Homoscedasticity
- Hoover index (a.k.a. Robin Hood index)
- Horvitz–Thompson estimator
- Hosmer–Lemeshow test
- Hotelling's T-squared distribution
- How to Lie with Statistics (book)
- Howland will forgery trial
- Hubbert curve
- Huber–White standard error – see Heteroscedasticity-consistent standard errors
- Huber loss function
- Human subject research
- Hurst exponent
- Hyper-exponential distribution
- Hyper-Graeco-Latin square design
- Hyperbolic distribution
- Hyperbolic secant distribution
- Hypergeometric distribution
- Hyperparameter (Bayesian statistics)
- Hyperparameter (machine learning)
- Hyperprior
- Hypoexponential distribution

== I ==
- Idealised population
- Idempotent matrix
- Identifiability
- Ignorability
- Illustration of the central limit theorem
- Image denoising
- Importance sampling
- Imprecise probability
- Impulse response
- Imputation (statistics)
- Incidence (epidemiology)
- Increasing process
- Indecomposable distribution
- Independence of irrelevant alternatives
- Independent component analysis
- Independent and identically distributed random variables
- Index (economics)
- Index of coincidence
- Index of dispersion
- Index of dissimilarity
- Indicators of spatial association
- Indirect least squares
- Inductive inference
- An inequality on location and scale parameters – see Chebyshev's inequality
- Inference
- Inferential statistics – redirects to Statistical inference
- Infinite divisibility (probability)
- Infinite monkey theorem
- Influence diagram
- Info-gap decision theory
- Information bottleneck method
- Information geometry
- Information gain ratio
- Information ratio – finance
- Information source (mathematics)
- Information theory
- Inherent bias
- Inherent zero
- Injury prevention – application
- Innovation (signal processing)
- Innovations vector
- Institutional review board
- Instrumental variable
- Integrated nested Laplace approximations
- Intention to treat analysis
- Interaction (statistics)
- Interaction variable – see Interaction (statistics)
- Interclass correlation
- Interdecile range
- Interim analysis
- Internal consistency
- Internal validity
- Interquartile mean
- Interquartile range
- Inter-rater reliability
- Interval estimation
- Intervening variable
- Intra-rater reliability
- Intraclass correlation
- Invariant estimator
- Invariant extended Kalman filter
- Inverse distance weighting
- Inverse distribution
- Inverse Gaussian distribution
- Inverse matrix gamma distribution
- Inverse Mills ratio
- Inverse probability
- Inverse probability weighting
- Inverse relationship
- Inverse-chi-squared distribution
- Inverse-gamma distribution
- Inverse transform sampling
- Inverse-variance weighting
- Inverse-Wishart distribution
- Iris flower data set
- Irwin–Hall distribution
- Isomap
- Isotonic regression
- Isserlis' theorem
- Item response theory
- Item-total correlation
- Item tree analysis
- Iterative proportional fitting
- Iteratively reweighted least squares
- Itô calculus
- Itô isometry
- Itô's lemma

== J ==
- Jaccard index
- Jackknife (statistics)
- Jackson network
- Jackson's theorem (queueing theory)
- Jadad scale
- James–Stein estimator
- Jarque–Bera test
- Jeffreys prior
- Jensen's inequality
- Jensen–Shannon divergence
- JMulTi – software
- Johansen test
- Johnson SU distribution
- Joint probability distribution
- Jonckheere's trend test
- JMP (statistical software)
- Jump process
- Jump-diffusion model
- Junction tree algorithm

== K ==
- K-distribution
- K-means algorithm – redirects to k-means clustering
- K-means++
- K-medians clustering
- K-medoids
- K-statistic
- Kalman filter
- Kaplan–Meier estimator
- Kappa coefficient
- Kappa statistic
- Karhunen–Loève theorem
- Kendall tau distance
- Kendall tau rank correlation coefficient
- Kendall's notation
- Kendall's W – Kendall's coefficient of concordance
- Kent distribution
- Kernel density estimation
- Kernel Fisher discriminant analysis
- Kernel methods
- Kernel principal component analysis
- Kernel regression
- Kernel smoother
- Kernel (statistics)
- Khmaladze transformation (probability theory)
- Killed process
- Khintchine inequality
- Kingman's formula
- Kirkwood approximation
- Kish grid
- Kitchen sink regression
- Klecka's tau
- Knightian uncertainty
- Kolmogorov backward equation
- Kolmogorov continuity theorem
- Kolmogorov extension theorem
- Kolmogorov's criterion
- Kolmogorov's generalized criterion
- Kolmogorov's inequality
- Kolmogorov's zero–one law
- Kolmogorov–Smirnov test
- KPSS test
- Kriging
- Krippendorff's alpha
- Kruskal–Wallis one-way analysis of variance
- Kuder–Richardson Formula 20
- Kuiper's test
- Kullback's inequality
- Kullback–Leibler divergence
- Kumaraswamy distribution
- Kurtosis
- Kushner equation

== L ==
- L-estimator
- L-moment
- Labour Force Survey
- Lack-of-fit sum of squares
- Lady tasting tea
- Lag operator
- Lag windowing
- Lambda distribution – disambiguation
- Landau distribution
- Lander–Green algorithm
- Language model
- Laplace distribution
- Laplace principle (large deviations theory)
- LaplacesDemon – software
- Large deviations theory
- Large deviations of Gaussian random functions
- LARS – see least-angle regression
- Latent variable, latent variable model
- Latent class model
- Latent Dirichlet allocation
- Latent growth modeling
- Latent semantic analysis
- Latin rectangle
- Latin square
- Latin hypercube sampling
- Law (stochastic processes)
- Law of averages
- Law of comparative judgment
- Law of large numbers
- Law of the iterated logarithm
- Law of the unconscious statistician
- Law of total covariance
- Law of total cumulance
- Law of total expectation
- Law of total probability
- Law of total variance
- Law of truly large numbers
- Layered hidden Markov model
- Le Cam's theorem
- Lead time bias
- Least absolute deviations
- Least-angle regression
- Least squares
- Least-squares spectral analysis
- Least squares support vector machine
- Least trimmed squares
- Learning theory (statistics)
- Leftover hash-lemma
- Lehmann–Scheffé theorem
- Length time bias
- Lepage test
- Levene's test
- Level of analysis
- Level of measurement
- Levenberg–Marquardt algorithm
- Leverage (statistics)
- Levey–Jennings chart – redirects to Laboratory quality control
- Lévy's convergence theorem
- Lévy's continuity theorem
- Lévy arcsine law
- Lévy distribution
- Lévy flight
- Lévy process
- Lewontin's Fallacy
- Lexis diagram
- Lexis ratio
- Lies, damned lies, and statistics
- Life expectancy
- Life table
- Lift (data mining)
- Likelihood function
- Likelihood principle
- Likelihood-ratio test
- Likelihood ratios in diagnostic testing
- Likert scale
- Lilliefors test
- Limited dependent variable
- Limiting density of discrete points
- Lincoln index
- Lindeberg's condition
- Lindley equation
- Lindley's paradox
- Line chart
- Line-intercept sampling
- Linear classifier
- Linear discriminant analysis
- Linear least squares
- Linear model
- Linear prediction
- Linear probability model
- Linear regression
- Linguistic demography
- Linnik distribution – redirects to Geometric stable distribution
- LISREL – proprietary statistical software package
- List of basic statistics topics – redirects to Outline of statistics
- List of convolutions of probability distributions
- List of graphical methods
- List of information graphics software
- List of probability topics
- List of random number generators
- List of scientific journals in statistics
- List of statistical packages
- List of statisticians
- Listwise deletion
- Little's law
- Littlewood's law
- Ljung–Box test
- Local convex hull
- Local independence
- Local martingale
- Local regression
- Location estimation – redirects to Location parameter
- Location estimation in sensor networks
- Location parameter
- Location test
- Location-scale family
- Local asymptotic normality
- Locality (statistics)
- Loess curve – redirects to Local regression
- Log-Cauchy distribution
- Log-Laplace distribution
- Log-normal distribution
- Log-linear analysis
- Log-linear model
- Log-linear modeling – redirects to Poisson regression
- Log-log plot
- Log-logistic distribution
- Logarithmic distribution
- Logarithmic mean
- Logistic distribution
- Logistic function
- Logistic regression
- Logit
- Logit analysis in marketing
- Logit-normal distribution
- Log-normal distribution
- Logrank test
- Lomax distribution
- Long-range dependency
- Long Tail
- Long-tail traffic
- Longitudinal study
- Longstaff–Schwartz model
- Lorenz curve
- Loss function
- Lot quality assurance sampling
- Lotka's law
- Low birth weight paradox
- Lucia de Berk – prob/stats related court case
- Lukacs's proportion-sum independence theorem
- Lumpability
- Lusser's law
- Lyapunov's central limit theorem

== M ==
- M/D/1 queue
- M/G/1 queue
- M/M/1 queue
- M/M/c queue
- M-estimator
  - Redescending M-estimator
- M-separation
- Mabinogion sheep problem
- Machine learning
- Mahalanobis distance
- Main effect
- Mallows's C_{p}
- MANCOVA
- Manhattan plot
- Mann–Whitney U
- MANOVA
- Mantel test
- MAP estimator – redirects to Maximum a posteriori estimation
- Marchenko–Pastur distribution
- Marcinkiewicz–Zygmund inequality
- Marcum Q-function
- Margin of error
- Marginal conditional stochastic dominance
- Marginal distribution
- Marginal likelihood
- Marginal model
- Marginal variable – redirects to Marginal distribution
- Mark and recapture
- Markov additive process
- Markov blanket
- Markov chain
  - Markov chain geostatistics
  - Markov chain mixing time
- Markov chain Monte Carlo
- Markov decision process
- Markov information source
- Markov kernel
- Markov logic network
- Markov model
- Markov network
- Markov process
- Markov property
- Markov random field
- Markov renewal process
- Markov's inequality
- Markovian arrival processes
- Marsaglia polar method
- Martingale (probability theory)
- Martingale difference sequence
- Martingale representation theorem
- Master equation
- Matched filter
- Matching pursuit
- Matching (statistics)
- Matérn covariance function
- Mathematica – software
- Mathematical biology
- Mathematical modelling in epidemiology
- Mathematical modelling of infectious disease
- Mathematical statistics
- Matthews correlation coefficient
- Matrix gamma distribution
- Matrix normal distribution
- Matrix population models
- Matrix t-distribution
- Mauchly's sphericity test
- Maximal ergodic theorem
- Maximal information coefficient
- Maximum a posteriori estimation
- Maximum entropy classifier – redirects to Logistic regression
- Maximum-entropy Markov model
- Maximum entropy method – redirects to Principle of maximum entropy
- Maximum entropy probability distribution
- Maximum entropy spectral estimation
- Maximum likelihood
- Maximum likelihood sequence estimation
- Maximum parsimony
- Maximum spacing estimation
- Maxwell speed distribution
- Maxwell–Boltzmann distribution
- Maxwell's theorem
- Mazziotta–Pareto index
- MCAR (missing completely at random)
- McCullagh's parametrization of the Cauchy distributions
- McDiarmid's inequality
- McDonald–Kreitman test – statistical genetics
- McKay's approximation for the coefficient of variation
- McNemar's test
- Meadow's law
- Mean
- Mean – see also expected value
- Mean absolute error
- Mean absolute percentage error
- Mean absolute scaled error
- Mean and predicted response
- Mean deviation (disambiguation)
- Mean difference
- Mean integrated squared error
- Mean of circular quantities
- Mean percentage error
- Mean preserving spread
- Mean reciprocal rank
- Mean signed difference
- Mean square quantization error
- Mean square weighted deviation
- Mean squared error
- Mean squared prediction error
- Mean time between failures
- Mean-reverting process – redirects to Ornstein–Uhlenbeck process
- Mean value analysis
- Measurement, level of – see level of measurement.
- Measurement invariance
- MedCalc – software
- Median
- Median absolute deviation
- Median polish
- Median test
- Mediation (statistics)
- Medical statistics
- Medoid
- Memorylessness
- Mendelian randomization
- Meta-analysis
- Meta-regression
- Metalog distribution
- Method of moments (statistics)
- Method of simulated moments
- Method of support
- Metropolis–Hastings algorithm
- Mexican paradox
- Microdata (statistics)
- Midhinge
- Mid-range
- MinHash
- Minimax
- Minimax estimator
- Minimisation (clinical trials)
- Minimum chi-square estimation
- Minimum distance estimation
- Minimum mean square error
- Minimum-variance unbiased estimator
- Minimum viable population
- Minitab
- MINQUE – minimum norm quadratic unbiased estimation
- Misleading graph
- Missing completely at random
- Missing data
- Missing values – see Missing data
- Mittag–Leffler distribution
- Mixed logit
- Misconceptions about the normal distribution
- Misuse of statistics
- Mixed data sampling
- Mixed-design analysis of variance
- Mixed model
- Mixing (mathematics)
- Mixture distribution
- Mixture model
- Mixture (probability)
- MLwiN
- Mode (statistics)
- Model output statistics
- Model selection
- Model specification
- Moderator variable – redirects to Moderation (statistics)
- Modifiable areal unit problem
- Moffat distribution
- Moment (mathematics)
- Moment-generating function
- Moments, method of – see method of moments (statistics)
- Moment problem
- Monotone likelihood ratio
- Monte Carlo integration
- Monte Carlo method
- Monte Carlo method for photon transport
- Monte Carlo methods for option pricing
- Monte Carlo methods in finance
- Monte Carlo molecular modeling
- Moral graph
- Moran process
- Moran's I
- Morisita's overlap index
- Morris method
- Mortality rate
- Most probable number
- Moving average
- Moving-average model
- Moving average representation – redirects to Wold's theorem
- Moving least squares
- Multi-armed bandit
- Multi-vari chart
- Multiclass classification
- Multiclass LDA (linear discriminant analysis) – redirects to Linear discriminant analysis
- Multicollinearity
- Multidimensional analysis
- Multidimensional Chebyshev's inequality
- Multidimensional panel data
- Multidimensional scaling
- Multifactor design of experiments software
- Multifactor dimensionality reduction
- Multilevel model
- Multilinear principal component analysis
- Multinomial distribution
- Multinomial logistic regression
- Multinomial logit – see Multinomial logistic regression
- Multinomial probit
- Multinomial test
- Multiple baseline design
- Multiple comparisons
- Multiple correlation
- Multiple correspondence analysis
- Multiple discriminant analysis
- Multiple-indicator kriging
- Multiple Indicator Cluster Survey
- Multiple of the median
- Multiple testing correction – redirects to Multiple comparisons
- Multiple-try Metropolis
- Multiresolution analysis
- Multiscale decision making
- Multiscale geometric analysis
- Multistage testing
- Multitaper
- Multitrait-multimethod matrix
- Multivariate adaptive regression splines
- Multivariate analysis
- Multivariate analysis of variance
- Multivariate distribution – see Joint probability distribution
- Multivariate kernel density estimation
- Multivariate normal distribution
- Multivariate Pareto distribution
- Multivariate Pólya distribution
- Multivariate probit – redirects to Multivariate probit model
- Multivariate random variable
- Multivariate stable distribution
- Multivariate statistics
- Multivariate Student distribution – redirects to Multivariate t-distribution
- Multivariate t-distribution

== N ==
- n = 1 fallacy
- N of 1 trial
- Naive Bayes classifier
- Nakagami distribution
- National and international statistical services
- Nash–Sutcliffe model efficiency coefficient
- National Health Interview Survey
- Natural experiment
- Natural exponential family
- Natural process variation
- NCSS (statistical software)
- Nearest-neighbor chain algorithm
- Negative binomial distribution
- Negative multinomial distribution
- Negative predictive value
- Negative relationship
- Negentropy
- Neighbourhood components analysis
- Neighbor joining
- Nelson rules
- Nelson–Aalen estimator
- Nemenyi test
- Nested case-control study
- Nested sampling algorithm
- Network probability matrix
- Neutral vector
- Newcastle–Ottawa scale
- Newey–West estimator
- Newman–Keuls method
- Neyer d-optimal test
- Neyman construction
- Neyman–Pearson lemma
- Nicholson–Bailey model
- Nominal category
- Noncentral beta distribution
- Noncentral chi distribution
- Noncentral chi-squared distribution
- Noncentral F-distribution
- Noncentral hypergeometric distributions
- Noncentral t-distribution
- Noncentrality parameter
- Nonlinear autoregressive exogenous model
- Nonlinear dimensionality reduction
- Non-linear iterative partial least squares
- Nonlinear regression
- Non-homogeneous Poisson process
- Non-linear least squares
- Non-negative matrix factorization
- Nonparametric skew
- Non-parametric statistics
- Non-response bias
- Non-sampling error
- Nonparametric regression
- Nonprobability sampling
- Normal curve equivalent
- Normal distribution
- Normal probability plot – see also rankit
- Normal score – see also rankit and Z score
- Normal variance-mean mixture
- Normal-exponential-gamma distribution
- Normal-gamma distribution
- Normal-inverse Gaussian distribution
- Normal-scaled inverse gamma distribution
- Normality test
- Normalization (statistics)
- Notation in probability and statistics
- Novikov's condition
- np-chart
- Null distribution
- Null hypothesis
- Null result
- Nuisance parameter
- Nuisance variable
- Numerical data
- Numerical methods for linear least squares
- Numerical parameter – redirects to statistical parameter
- Numerical smoothing and differentiation
- Nuremberg Code

== O ==
- O'Brien–Fleming boundary
- Observable variable
- Observational equivalence
- Observational error
- Observational study
- Observed information
- Occupancy frequency distribution
- Odds
- Odds algorithm
- Odds ratio
- Official statistics
- Ogden tables
- Ogive (statistics)
- Omitted-variable bias
- Omnibus test
- One- and two-tailed tests
- One-class classification
- One-factor-at-a-time method
- One-tailed test – redirects to One- and two-tailed tests
- One-way analysis of variance
- Online NMF Online Non-negative Matrix Factorisation
- Open-label trial
- OpenEpi – software
- OpenBUGS – software
- Operational confound
- Operational sex ratio
- Operations research
- Opinion poll
- Optimal decision
- Optimal design
- Optimal discriminant analysis
- Optimal matching
- Optimal stopping
- Optimality criterion
- Optimistic knowledge gradient
- Optional stopping theorem
- Order of a kernel
- Order of integration
- Order statistic
- Ordered logit
- Ordered probit
- Ordered subset expectation maximization
- Ordinal regression
- Ordinary least squares
- Ordination (statistics)
- Ornstein–Uhlenbeck process
- Orthogonal array testing
- Orthogonality
- Orthogonality principle
- Outlier
- Outliers ratio
- Outline of probability
- Outline of regression analysis
- Outline of statistics
- Overdispersion
- Overfitting
- Owen's T function
- OxMetrics – software

== P ==
- p-chart
- p-rep
- P-value
- P–P plot
- Page's trend test
- Paid survey
- Paired comparison analysis
- Paired difference test
- Pairwise comparison
- Pairwise independence
- Panel analysis
- Panel data
- Panjer recursion – a class of discrete compound distributions
- Paley–Zygmund inequality
- Parabolic fractal distribution
- PARAFAC (parallel factor analysis)
- Parallel coordinates – graphical display of data
- Parallel factor analysis – redirects to PARAFAC
- Paradigm (experimental)
- Parameter identification problem
- Parameter space
- Parametric family
- Parametric model
- Parametric statistics
- Pareto analysis
- Pareto chart
- Pareto distribution
- Pareto index
- Pareto interpolation
- Pareto principle
- Park test
- Partial autocorrelation – redirects to Partial autocorrelation function
- Partial autocorrelation function
- Partial correlation
- Partial least squares
- Partial least squares regression
- Partial leverage
- Partial regression plot
- Partial residual plot
- Particle filter
- Partition of sums of squares
- Parzen window
- Path analysis (statistics)
- Path coefficient
- Path space (disambiguation)
- Pattern recognition
- Pearson's chi-squared test (one of various chi-squared tests)
- Pearson distribution
- Pearson product-moment correlation coefficient
- Pedometric mapping
- People v. Collins (prob/stats related court case)
- Per capita
- Per-comparison error rate
- Per-protocol analysis
- Percentile
- Percentile rank
- Periodic variation – redirects to Seasonality
- Periodogram
- Peirce's criterion
- Pensim2 – an econometric model
- Percentage point
- Permutation code
- Permutation test – redirects to Resampling (statistics)
- Pharmaceutical statistics
- Phase dispersion minimization
- Phase-type distribution
- Phi coefficient
- Phillips–Perron test
- Philosophy of probability
- Philosophy of statistics
- Pickands–Balkema–de Haan theorem
- Pie chart
- Piecewise-deterministic Markov process
- Pignistic probability
- Pill puzzle
- Pinsker's inequality
- Pitman closeness criterion
- Pitman–Koopman–Darmois theorem
- Pitman–Yor process
- Pivotal quantity
- Placebo-controlled study
- Plackett–Burman design
- Plate notation
- Plot (graphics)
- Pocock boundary
- Poincaré plot
- Point-biserial correlation coefficient
- Point estimation
- Point pattern analysis
- Point process
- Poisson binomial distribution
- Poisson distribution
- Poisson hidden Markov model
- Poisson limit theorem
- Poisson process
- Poisson regression
- Poisson random numbers – redirects to section of Poisson distribution
- Poisson sampling
- Polar distribution – see Circular distribution
- Policy capturing
- Political forecasting
- Pollaczek–Khinchine formula
- Pollyanna Creep
- Polykay
- Poly-Weibull distribution
- Polychoric correlation
- Polynomial and rational function modeling
- Polynomial chaos
- Polynomial regression
- Polytree (Bayesian networks)
- Pooled standard deviation – redirects to Pooled variance
- Pooling design
- Popoviciu's inequality on variances
- Population
- Population dynamics
- Population ecology – application
- Population modeling
- Population process
- Population pyramid
- Population statistics
- Population variance
- Population viability analysis
- Portmanteau test
- Positive predictive value
- Post-hoc analysis
- Posterior predictive distribution
- Posterior probability
- Power law
- Power transform
- Prais–Winsten estimation
- Pre- and post-test probability
- Precision (statistics)
- Precision and recall
- Prediction interval
- Predictive analytics
- Predictive inference
- Predictive informatics
- Predictive intake modelling
- Predictive modelling
- Predictive validity
- Preference regression (in marketing)
- Preferential attachment process – see Preferential attachment
- PRESS statistic
- Prevalence
- Principal component analysis
  - Multilinear principal-component analysis
- Principal component regression
- Principal geodesic analysis
- Principal stratification
- Principle of indifference
- Principle of marginality
- Principle of maximum entropy
- Prior knowledge for pattern recognition
- Prior probability
- Prior probability distribution – redirects to Prior probability
- Probabilistic causation
- Probabilistic design
- Probabilistic forecasting
- Probabilistic latent semantic analysis
- Probabilistic metric space
- Probabilistic proposition
- Probabilistic relational model
- Probability
- Probability bounds analysis
- Probability box
- Probability density function
- Probability distribution
- Probability distribution function (disambiguation)
- Probability integral transform
- Probability interpretations
- Probability mass function
- Probability matching
- Probability metric
- Probability of error
- Probability of precipitation
- Probability plot
- Probability plot correlation coefficient – redirects to Q–Q plot
- Probability plot correlation coefficient plot
- Probability space
- Probability theory
- Probability-generating function
- Probable error
- Probit
- Probit model
- Procedural confound
- Process control
- Process Window Index
- Procrustes analysis
- Proebsting's paradox
- Product distribution
- Product form solution
- Profile likelihood – redirects to Likelihood function
- Progressively measurable process
- Prognostics
- Projection pursuit
- Projection pursuit regression
- Proof of Stein's example
- Propagation of uncertainty
- Propensity probability
- Propensity score
- Propensity score matching
- Proper linear model
- Proportional hazards models
- Proportional reduction in loss
- Prosecutor's fallacy
- Proxy (statistics)
- Psephology
- Pseudo-determinant
- Pseudo-random number sampling
- Pseudocount
- Pseudolikelihood
- Pseudomedian
- Pseudoreplication
- PSPP (free software)
- Psychological statistics
- Psychometrics
- Pythagorean expectation

== Q ==
- Q test
- Q-exponential distribution
- Q-function
- Q-Gaussian distribution
- Q–Q plot
- Q-statistic (disambiguation)
- Quadrat
- Quadrant count ratio
- Quadratic classifier
- Quadratic form (statistics)
- Quadratic variation
- Qualitative comparative analysis
- Qualitative data
- Qualitative variation
- Quality control
- Quantile
- Quantile function
- Quantile normalization
- Quantile regression
- Quantile-parameterized distribution
- Quantitative marketing research
- Quantitative psychological research
- Quantitative research
- Quartile
- Quartile coefficient of dispersion
- Quasi-birth–death process
- Quasi-experiment
- Quasi-experimental design – see Design of quasi-experiments
- Quasi-likelihood
- Quasi-maximum likelihood
- Quasireversibility
- Quasi-variance
- Questionnaire
- Queueing model
- Queueing theory
- Queuing delay
- Queuing theory in teletraffic engineering
- Quota sampling

== R ==
- R programming language – see R (programming language)
- R v Adams (prob/stats related court case)
- Radar chart
- Rademacher distribution
- Radial basis function network
- Raikov's theorem
- Raised cosine distribution
- Ramaswami's formula
- Ramsey RESET test – the Ramsey Regression Equation Specification Error Test
- Rand index
- Random assignment
- Random compact set
- Random data – see randomness
- Random effects estimation – see Random effects model
- Random effects model
- Random element
- Random field
- Random function
- Random graph
- Random matrix
- Random measure
- Random multinomial logit
- Random naive Bayes
- Random permutation statistics
- Random regular graph
- Random sample
- Random sampling
- Random sequence
- Random variable
- Random variate
- Random walk
- Random walk hypothesis
- Randomization
- Randomized block design
- Randomized controlled trial
- Randomized decision rule
- Randomized experiment
- Randomized response
- Randomness
- Randomness tests
- Range (statistics)
- Rank abundance curve
- Rank correlation mainly links to two following
  - Spearman's rank correlation coefficient
  - Kendall tau rank correlation coefficient
- Rank product
- Rank–size distribution
- Ranking
- Rankit
- Ranklet
- RANSAC
- Rao–Blackwell theorem
- Rao–Blackwellisation – see Rao–Blackwell theorem
- Rasch model
  - Polytomous Rasch model
- Rasch model estimation
- Ratio distribution
- Ratio estimator
- Rational quadratic covariance function
- Rayleigh distribution
- Rayleigh mixture distribution
- Raw score
- Realization (probability)
- Recall bias
- Receiver operating characteristic
- Reciprocal distribution
- Rectified Gaussian distribution
- Recurrence period density entropy
- Recurrence plot
- Recurrence quantification analysis
- Recursive Bayesian estimation
- Recursive least squares
- Recursive partitioning
- Reduced form
- Reference class problem
- Reflected Brownian motion
- Regenerative process
- Regression analysis – see also linear regression
- Regression Analysis of Time Series – proprietary software
- Regression control chart
- Regression diagnostic
- Regression dilution
- Regression discontinuity design
- Regression estimation
- Regression fallacy
- Regression-kriging
- Regression model validation
- Regression toward the mean
- Regret (decision theory)
- Reification (statistics)
- Rejection sampling
- Relationships among probability distributions
- Relative change and difference
- Relative efficiency – redirects to Efficiency (statistics)
- Relative index of inequality
- Relative likelihood
- Relative risk
- Relative risk reduction
- Relative standard deviation
- Relative standard error – redirects to Relative standard deviation
- Relative variance – redirects to Relative standard deviation
- Relative survival
- Relativistic Breit–Wigner distribution
- Relevance vector machine
- Reliability (statistics)
- Reliability block diagram
- Reliability engineering
- Reliability theory
- Reliability theory of aging and longevity
- Rencontres numbers – a discrete distribution
- Renewal theory
- Repeatability
- Repeated measures design
- Replication (statistics)
- Representation validity
- Reproducibility
- Resampling (statistics)
- Rescaled range
- Resentful demoralization – experimental design
- Residual. See errors and residuals in statistics.
- Residual sum of squares
- Response bias
- Response rate (survey)
- Response surface methodology
- Response variable
- Restricted maximum likelihood
- Restricted randomization
- Reversible-jump Markov chain Monte Carlo
- Reversible dynamics
- Rind et al. controversy – interpretations of paper involving meta-analysis
- Rice distribution
- Richardson–Lucy deconvolution
- Ridge regression – redirects to Tikhonov regularization
- Ridit scoring
- Risk adjusted mortality rate
- Risk factor
- Risk function
- Risk perception
- Risk theory
- Risk–benefit analysis
- Robbins lemma
- Robust Bayesian analysis
- Robust confidence intervals
- Robust measures of scale
- Robust regression
- Robust statistics
- Root mean square
- Root-mean-square deviation
- Root mean square deviation (bioinformatics)
- Root mean square fluctuation
- Ross's conjecture
- Rossmo's formula
- Rothamsted Experimental Station
- Round robin test
- Rubin causal model
- Ruin theory
- Rule of succession
- Rule of three (medicine)
- Run chart
- RV coefficient

== S ==
- S (programming language)
- S-PLUS
- Safety in numbers
- Sally Clark (prob/stats related court case)
- Sammon projection
- Sample mean and covariance – redirects to Sample mean and sample covariance
- Sample mean and sample covariance
- Sample maximum and minimum
- Sample size determination
- Sample space
- Sample (statistics)
- Sample-continuous process
- Sampling (statistics)
  - Simple random sampling
  - Snowball sampling
  - Systematic sampling
  - Stratified sampling
  - Cluster sampling
  - distance sampling
  - Multistage sampling
  - Nonprobability sampling
  - Slice sampling
- Sampling bias
- Sampling design
- Sampling distribution
- Sampling error
- Sampling fraction
- Sampling frame
- Sampling probability
- Sampling risk
- Samuelson's inequality
- Sargan test
- SAS (software)
- SAS language
- SAS System – see SAS (software)
- Savitzky–Golay smoothing filter
- Sazonov's theorem
- Saturated array
- Scale analysis (statistics)
- Scale parameter
- Scaled-inverse-chi-squared distribution
- Scaling pattern of occupancy
- Scatter matrix
- Scatter plot
- Scatterplot smoothing
- Scheffé's method
- Scheirer–Ray–Hare test
- Schilder's theorem
- Schramm–Loewner evolution
- Schuette–Nesbitt formula
- Schwarz criterion
- Score (statistics)
- Score test
- Scoring algorithm
- Scoring rule
- SCORUS
- Scott's Pi
- SDMX – a standard for exchanging statistical data
- Seasonal adjustment
- Seasonality
- Seasonal subseries plot
- Seasonal variation
- Seasonally adjusted annual rate
- Second moment method
- Secretary problem
- Secular variation
- Seed-based d mapping
- Seemingly unrelated regressions
- Seismic to simulation
- Selection bias
- Selective recruitment
- Self-organizing map
- Self-selection bias
- Self-similar process
- Segmented regression
- Seismic inversion
- Self-similarity matrix
- Semantic mapping (statistics)
- Semantic relatedness
- Semantic similarity
- Semi-Markov process
- Semi-log graph
- Semidefinite embedding
- Semimartingale
- Semiparametric model
- Semiparametric regression
- Semivariance
- Sensitivity (tests)
- Sensitivity analysis
- Sensitivity and specificity
- Sensitivity index
- Separation test
- Sequential analysis
- Sequential estimation
- Sequential Monte Carlo methods – redirects to Particle filter
- Sequential probability ratio test
- Serial dependence
- Seriation (archaeology)
- SETAR (model) – a time series model
- Sethi model
- Seven-number summary
- Sexual dimorphism measures
- Shannon–Hartley theorem
- Shape of the distribution
- Shape parameter
- Shapiro–Wilk test
- Sharpe ratio
- SHAZAM (software)
- Shewhart individuals control chart
- Shifted Gompertz distribution
- Shifted log-logistic distribution
- Shifting baseline
- Shrinkage (statistics)
- Shrinkage estimator
- Sichel distribution
- Siegel–Tukey test
- Sieve estimator
- Sigma-algebra
- SigmaStat – software
- Sign test
- Signal-to-noise ratio
- Signal-to-noise statistic
- Significance analysis of microarrays
- Silhouette (clustering)
- Simfit – software
- Similarity matrix
- Simon model
- Simple linear regression
- Simple moving average crossover
- Simple random sample
- Simpson's paradox
- Simulated annealing
- Simultaneous equation methods (econometrics)
- Simultaneous equations model
- Single equation methods (econometrics)
- Single-linkage clustering
- Singular distribution
- Singular spectrum analysis
- Sinusoidal model
- Sinkov statistic
- Size (statistics)
- Skellam distribution
- Skew normal distribution
- Skewness
- Skorokhod's representation theorem
- Slash distribution
- Slice sampling
- Sliced inverse regression
- Slutsky's theorem
- Small area estimation
- Smearing retransformation
- Smoothing
- Smoothing spline
- Smoothness (probability theory)
- Snowball sampling
- Sobel test
- Social network change detection
- Social statistics
- SOFA Statistics – software
- Soliton distribution – redirects to Luby transform code
- Somers' D
- Sørensen similarity index
- Spaghetti plot
- Sparse binary polynomial hashing
- Sparse PCA – sparse principal components analysis
- Sparsity-of-effects principle
- Spatial analysis
- Spatial dependence
- Spatial descriptive statistics
- Spatial distribution
- Spatial econometrics
- Spatial statistics – redirects to Spatial analysis
- Spatial variability
- Spearman's rank correlation coefficient
- Spearman–Brown prediction formula
- Species discovery curve
- Specification (regression) – redirects to Statistical model specification
- Specificity (tests)
- Spectral clustering – (cluster analysis)
- Spectral density
- Spectral density estimation
- Spectrum bias
- Spectrum continuation analysis
- Speed prior
- Spherical design
- Split normal distribution
- SPRT – redirects to Sequential probability ratio test
- SPSS – software
- SPSS Clementine – software (data mining)
- Spurious relationship
- Square root biased sampling
- Squared deviations
- St. Petersburg paradox
- Stability (probability)
- Stable distribution
- Stable and tempered stable distributions with volatility clustering – financial applications
- Standard deviation
- Standard error
- Standard normal deviate
- Standard normal table
- Standard probability space
- Standard score
- Standardized coefficient
- Standardized moment
- Standardised mortality rate
- Standardized mortality ratio
- Standardized rate
- Stanine
- STAR model – a time series model
- Star plot – redirects to Radar chart
- Stata
- State space representation
- Statgraphics – software
- Static analysis
- Stationary distribution
- Stationary ergodic process
- Stationary process
- Stationary sequence
- Stationary subspace analysis
- Statistic
- STATISTICA – software
- Statistical arbitrage
- Statistical assembly
- Statistical assumption
- Statistical benchmarking
- Statistical classification
- Statistical conclusion validity
- Statistical consultant
- Statistical deviance – see deviance (statistics)
- Statistical dispersion
- Statistical distance
- Statistical efficiency
- Statistical epidemiology
- Statistical estimation – redirects to Estimation theory
- Statistical finance
- Statistical genetics – redirects to population genetics
- Statistical geography
- Statistical graphics
- Statistical hypothesis testing
- Statistical independence
- Statistical inference
- Statistical interference
- Statistical Lab – software
- Statistical learning theory
- Statistical literacy
- Statistical model
- Statistical model specification
- Statistical model validation
- Statistical noise
- Statistical package
- Statistical parameter
- Statistical parametric mapping
- Statistical parsing
- Statistical population
- Statistical power
- Statistical probability
- Statistical process control
- Statistical proof
- Statistical randomness
- Statistical range – see range (statistics)
- Statistical regularity
- Statistical relational learning
- Statistical sample
- Statistical semantics
- Statistical shape analysis
- Statistical signal processing
- Statistical significance
- Statistical survey
- Statistical syllogism
- Statistical theory
- Statistical unit
- Statisticians' and engineers' cross-reference of statistical terms
- Statistics
- Statistics education
- Statistics Online Computational Resource – training materials
- StatPlus
- StatXact – software
- Stein's example
  - Proof of Stein's example
- Stein's lemma
- Stein's unbiased risk estimate
- Steiner system
- Stemplot – see Stem-and-leaf display
- Step detection
- Stepwise regression
- Stieltjes moment problem
- Stimulus-response model
- Stochastic
- Stochastic approximation
- Stochastic calculus
- Stochastic convergence
- Stochastic differential equation
- Stochastic dominance
- Stochastic drift
- Stochastic equicontinuity
- Stochastic gradient descent
- Stochastic grammar
- Stochastic investment model
- Stochastic kernel estimation
- Stochastic matrix
- Stochastic modelling (insurance)
- Stochastic optimization
- Stochastic ordering
- Stochastic process
- Stochastic rounding
- Stochastic simulation
- Stopped process
- Stopping time
- Stratified sampling
- Stratonovich integral
- Streamgraph
- Stress majorization
- Strong law of small numbers
- Strong prior
- Structural break
- Structural equation modeling
- Structural estimation
- Structured data analysis (statistics)
- Studentized range
- Studentized residual
- Student's t-distribution
- Student's t-statistic
- Student's t-test
- Student's t-test for Gaussian scale mixture distributions – see Location testing for Gaussian scale mixture distributions
- Studentization
- Study design
- Study heterogeneity
- Subcontrary mean – redirects to Harmonic mean
- Subgroup analysis
- Subindependence
- Substitution model
- SUDAAN – software
- Sufficiency (statistics) – see Sufficient statistic
- Sufficient dimension reduction
- Sufficient statistic
- Sum of normally distributed random variables
- Sum of squares (disambiguation) – general disambiguation
- Sum of squares (statistics) – see Partition of sums of squares
- Summary statistic
- Support curve
- Support vector machine
- Surrogate model
- Survey data collection
- Survey sampling
- Survey methodology
- Survival analysis
- Survival rate
- Survival function
- Survivorship bias
- Symmetric design
- Symmetric mean absolute percentage error
- SYSTAT – software
- System dynamics
- System identification
- Systematic error (also see bias (statistics) and errors and residuals in statistics)
- Systematic review

== T ==
- t-distribution – see Student's t-distribution (includes table)
- T distribution (disambiguation)
- t-statistic
- Tag cloud – graphical display of info
- Taguchi loss function
- Taguchi methods
- Tajima's D
- Taleb distribution
- Tampering (quality control)
- Taylor expansions for the moments of functions of random variables
- Taylor's law – empirical variance-mean relations
- Telegraph process
- Test for structural change
- Test–retest reliability
- Test score
- Test set
- Test statistic
- Testimator
- Testing hypotheses suggested by the data
- Tetrachoric correlation
- Text analytics
- The Long Tail – possibly seminal magazine article
- The Unscrambler – software
- Theil index
- Theil–Sen estimator
- Theory of conjoint measurement
- Therapeutic effect
- Thompson sampling
- Three-point estimation
- Three-stage least squares
- Threshold model
- Thurstone scale
- Thurstonian model
- Time–frequency analysis
- Time–frequency representation
- Time reversibility
- Time series
- Time-series regression
- Time use survey
- Time-varying covariate
- Timeline of probability and statistics
- TinkerPlots – proprietary software for schools
- Tobit model
- Tolerance interval
- Top-coded
- Topic model (statistical natural language processing)
- Topological data analysis
- Tornqvist index
- Total correlation
- Total least squares
- Total sum of squares
- Total survey error
- Total variation distance – a statistical distance measure
- TPL Tables – software
- Tracy–Widom distribution
- Traffic equations
- Training set
- Transect
- Transferable belief model
- Transiogram
- Transition rate matrix
- Treatment and control groups
- Trend analysis
- Trend estimation
- Trend-stationary process
- Treynor ratio
- Triangular distribution
- Trimean
- Trimmed estimator
- Trispectrum
- True experiment
- True variance
- Truncated distribution
- Truncated mean
- Truncated normal distribution
- Truncated regression model
- Truncation (statistics)
- Tsallis distribution
- Tsallis statistics
- Tschuprow's T
- Tucker decomposition
- Tukey's range test – multiple comparisons
- Tukey's test of additivity – interaction in two-way anova
- Tukey–Duckworth test
- Tukey–Kramer method
- Tukey lambda distribution
- Tweedie distribution
- Twisting properties
- Two stage least squares – redirects to Instrumental variable
- Two-tailed test
- Two-way analysis of variance
- Type I and type II errors
- Type-1 Gumbel distribution
- Type-2 Gumbel distribution
- Tyranny of averages

== U ==
- u-chart
- U-quadratic distribution
- U-statistic
- U test
- Umbrella sampling
- Unbiased estimator – see bias (statistics)
- Unbiased estimation of standard deviation
- Uncertainty
- Uncertainty coefficient
- Uncertainty quantification
- Uncomfortable science
- Uncorrelated
- Underdispersion – redirects to Overdispersion
- Underfitting – redirects to Overfitting
- Underprivileged area score
- Unevenly spaced time series
- Unexplained variation – see Explained variation
- Uniform distribution (continuous)
- Uniform distribution (discrete)
- Uniformly most powerful test
- Unimodal distribution – redirects to Unimodal function (has some stats context)
- Unimodality
- Unit (statistics)
- Unit of observation
- Unit root
- Unit root test
- Unit-weighted regression
- Unitized risk
- Univariate
- Univariate analysis
- Univariate distribution
- Unmatched count
- Unseen species problem
- Unsolved problems in statistics
- Upper and lower probabilities
- Upside potential ratio – finance
- Urn problem
- Ursell function
- Utility maximization problem
- Utilization distribution

== V ==
- Validity (statistics)
- Van der Waerden test
- Van Houtum distribution
- Vapnik–Chervonenkis theory
- Varadhan's lemma
- Variable
- Variable kernel density estimation
- Variable-order Bayesian network
- Variable-order Markov model
- Variable rules analysis
- Variance
- Variance decomposition of forecast errors
- Variance gamma process
- Variance inflation factor
- Variance-gamma distribution
- Variance reduction
- Variance-stabilizing transformation
- Variance-to-mean ratio
- Variation ratio
- Variational Bayesian methods
- Variational message passing
- Variogram
- Varimax rotation
- Vasicek model
- VC dimension
- VC theory
- Vector autoregression
- VEGAS algorithm
- Violin plot
- ViSta – Software, see ViSta, The Visual Statistics system
- Voigt profile
- Volatility (finance)
- Volcano plot (statistics)
- Von Mises distribution
- Von Mises–Fisher distribution
- V-optimal histograms
- V-statistic
- Vuong's closeness test
- Vysochanskiï–Petunin inequality

== W ==
- Wait list control group
- Wald distribution – redirects to Inverse Gaussian distribution
- Wald test
- Wald–Wolfowitz runs test
- Wallenius' noncentral hypergeometric distribution
- Wang and Landau algorithm
- Ward's method
- Watterson estimator
- Watts and Strogatz model
- Weibull chart – redirects to Weibull distribution
- Weibull distribution
- Weibull modulus
- Weight function
- Weighted median
- Weighted covariance matrix – redirects to Sample mean and sample covariance
- Weighted mean
- Weighted sample – redirects to Sample mean and sample covariance
- Welch's method – spectral density estimation
- Welch's t test
- Welch–Satterthwaite equation
- Well-behaved statistic
- Wick product
- Wilks' lambda distribution
- Wilks' theorem
- Winsorized mean
- Whipple's index
- White test
- White noise
- Wide and narrow data
- Wiener deconvolution
- Wiener filter
- Wiener process
- Wigner quasi-probability distribution
- Wigner semicircle distribution
- Wike's law of low odd primes
- Wilcoxon signed-rank test
- Will Rogers phenomenon
- WinBUGS – software
- Window function
- Winpepi – software
- Winsorising
- Wishart distribution
- Wold's theorem
- Wombling
- Working–Hotelling procedure
- World Programming System – software
- Wrapped Cauchy distribution
- Wrapped distribution
- Wrapped exponential distribution
- Wrapped normal distribution
- Wrapped Lévy distribution
- Writer invariant

== X ==
- X-12-ARIMA
- $\bar x$ chart
- $\bar x$ and R chart
- $\bar x$ and s chart
- XLispStat – software
- XploRe – software

== Y ==
- Yamartino method
- Yates analysis
- Yates's correction for continuity
- Youden's J statistic
- Yule's Y – redirects to Coefficient of colligation
- Yule–Simon distribution

== Z ==
- z-score
- z-factor
- z statistic
- Z-test
- Z-transform
- Zakai equation
- Zelen's design
- Zero degrees of freedom
- Zero–one law (disambiguation)
- Zeta distribution
- Ziggurat algorithm
- Zipf–Mandelbrot law – a discrete distribution
- Zipf's law

== See also ==
Supplementary lists

These lists include items which are somehow related to statistics however are not included in this index:

- List of statisticians
- List of important publications in statistics
- List of scientific journals in statistics

Topic lists

- Outline of statistics
- List of probability topics
- Glossary of probability and statistics
- Glossary of experimental design
- Notation in probability and statistics
- List of probability distributions
- List of graphical methods
- List of fields of application of statistics
- List of stochastic processes topics
- Lists of statistics topics
- List of statistical packages
