= GMDS =

GMDS may refer to:

- GDP-mannose 4,6-dehydratase, an enzyme encoded by the gene GMDS
- Generalized multidimensional scaling
