= Rii =

Rii or RII may refer to:

- Air Costa Rica (ICAO: RII), a defunct Costa Rican airline
- Rii Sen, Bengali actress
- Relative index of inequality or RII
- Soria railway station (IATA: RII), the main railway station of Soria, Spain

== See also ==
- Riis
