= Digby's H =

Statistical measure of association

Digby's H is a measure of association for a 2 × 2 contingency table. It is a nonlinear transformation of the odds ratio, proposed by P. G. N. Digby in 1983 as a computationally simple approximation to the tetrachoric correlation coefficient, which otherwise requires iterative numerical estimation.

== Formula ==
For a 2×2 table of binary variables U and V with cell frequencies or proportions

	V = 0	V = 1
U = 0	a	b
U = 1	c	d

the odds ratio is

$$\omega=\frac{ad}{bc}.$$

Digby's H is defined as

$$H=\frac{(ad)^{3/4}-(bc)^{3/4}}{(ad)^{3/4}+(bc)^{3/4}}.$$

Equivalently, in terms of the odds ratio,

$$H=\frac{\omega^{3/4}-1}{\omega^{3/4}+1}.$$

== Properties ==
Digby's H ranges from −1 to 1. It equals zero under statistical independence of U and V, since independence implies $ad=bc$ and hence $\omega=1$. Positive values indicate positive association; negative values indicate negative association.

Because H depends on the table only through the ratio ad/bc, it is invariant under multiplication of all four cell frequencies by the same positive constant, and — like any function of the odds ratio alone — its value is determined by ω independently of the row and column marginal totals.

Digby's H belongs to a one-parameter family of odds-ratio transformations sometimes called generalized Yule coefficients,

$$S_q=\frac{(ad)^q-(bc)^q}{(ad)^q+(bc)^q},$$

where $q=1$ gives Yule's Q,

$$Q=\frac{ad-bc}{ad+bc},$$

$q=1/2$ gives Yule's Y,

$$Y=\frac{\sqrt{ad}-\sqrt{bc}}{\sqrt{ad}+\sqrt{bc}},$$

and $q=3/4$ gives Digby's H. All members of this family are zero under independence and share the same sign as $ad-bc$.

== See also ==
- Contingency table
- Phi coefficient
