= Belt transect =

Belt transects are used in biology, more specifically in biostatistics, to estimate the distribution of organisms in relation to a certain area, such as the seashore or a meadow.

The belt transect method is similar to the line transect method but gives information on abundance as well as presence, or absence of species.

== Method ==
The method involves laying out a transect line and then placing quadrats over the line, starting the quadrat at the first marked point of the line. Any consistent measurement size for the quadrat and length of the line can be chosen, depending on the species. With the quadrats applied, all the individuals of a species can be counted, and the species abundance can be estimated. The method is also suitable for long-term observations with a permanent installation.
