= T distribution =

The phrase "T distribution" may refer to

- Student's t-distribution in univariate probability theory,
- Hotelling's T-square distribution in multivariate statistics.
- Multivariate Student distribution.
