= Sentient Information Systems =

Dutch software provider specialized in data mining

Sentient Information Systems BV
- Type: Private
- Industry: Business intelligence
- Founded: 2001
- Headquarters: Amsterdam, the Netherlands
- Key people: Marten den Uyl, CEO; Hans Kapitein, CTO; Pieter Bison, Founder
- Products: DataDetective; DoelgroepDetector
- Website: www.sentient.nl

Sentient Information Systems BV is a Dutch software provider specialized in data mining. The company was founded in 2001 out of the former Sentient Machine Research (SMR) and is located in Amsterdam.

Sentient's flagship product is DataDetective, a data mining platform capable of analyzing information from various domains. Users of this tool include several Dutch police departments, hospitals, insurance and media companies.
