= Factor regression model =

Within statistical factor analysis, the factor regression model, or hybrid factor model, is a special multivariate model with the following form:

$$\mathbf{y}_n= \mathbf{A}\mathbf{x}_n+   \mathbf{B}\mathbf{z}_n +\mathbf{c}+\mathbf{e}_n$$

where,

$\mathbf{y}_n$ is the $n$-th $G \times 1$ (known) observation.

$\mathbf{x}_n$ is the $n$-th sample $L_x$ (unknown) hidden factors.

$\mathbf{A}$ is the (unknown) loading matrix of the hidden factors.

$\mathbf{z}_n$ is the $n$-th sample $L_z$ (known) design factors.

$\mathbf{B}$ is the (unknown) regression coefficients of the design factors.

$\mathbf{c}$ is a vector of (unknown) constant term or intercept.

$\mathbf{e}_n$ is a vector of (unknown) errors, often white Gaussian noise.

== Relationship between factor regression model, factor model and regression model ==
The factor regression model can be viewed as a combination of factor analysis model ($\mathbf{y}_n= \mathbf{A}\mathbf{x}_n+ \mathbf{c}+\mathbf{e}_n$) and regression model ($\mathbf{y}_n= \mathbf{B}\mathbf{z}_n +\mathbf{c}+\mathbf{e}_n$).

Alternatively, the model can be viewed as a special kind of factor model, the hybrid factor model

$$\begin{align}
& \mathbf{y}_n = \mathbf{A}\mathbf{x}_n+   \mathbf{B}\mathbf{z}_n +\mathbf{c}+\mathbf{e}_n \\
= & \begin{bmatrix}
\mathbf{A} & \mathbf{B}
\end{bmatrix}
\begin{bmatrix}
\mathbf{x}_n \\
\mathbf{z}_n\end{bmatrix} +\mathbf{c}+\mathbf{e}_n \\
= & \mathbf{D}\mathbf{f}_n +\mathbf{c}+\mathbf{e}_n
\end{align}$$

where,
$$\mathbf{D}=\begin{bmatrix}
\mathbf{A} & \mathbf{B}
\end{bmatrix}$$
is the loading matrix of the hybrid factor model and
$$\mathbf{f}_n=\begin{bmatrix}
\mathbf{x}_n \\
\mathbf{z}_n\end{bmatrix}$$
are the factors, including the known factors and unknown factors.

== Software ==
Open source software to perform factor regression is available.
