= Fleming–Viot process =

In probability theory, a Fleming–Viot process (F–V process) is a member of a particular subset of probability measure-valued Markov processes on compact metric spaces, as defined in the 1979 paper by Wendell Helms Fleming and Michel Viot. Such processes are martingales and diffusions.

The Fleming–Viot processes have proved to be important to the development of a mathematical basis for the theories behind allele drift. They are generalisations of the Wright–Fisher process and arise as infinite population limits of suitably rescaled variants of Moran processes.

== See also ==
- Coalescent theory
- Voter model
