= Tyranny of averages =

Concept in applied statistics

The tyranny of averages is a phrase used in applied statistics to describe the often overlooked fact that the mean does not provide any information about the shape of the probability distribution of a data set or skewness, and that decisions or analysis based on only the mean—as opposed to median and standard deviation—may be faulty.

A UN Development Program press release discusses a real-world example:

A new report launched 1 July [2005] warns that in Asia and the Pacific, the rising prosperity and fast growth in populous countries like China and India is hiding widespread extreme poverty in the Least Developed Countries (LDCs). The result is potentially very debilitating to development efforts in the 14 Asia-Pacific LDCs. This "tyranny of averages" to which the report refers tends to mask the stark contrast between the Asia-Pacific LDCs' sluggish economies and the success of their far more populous neighbours.

== See also ==
- Law of large numbers
- Law of averages
- Trimean
