= Coherence (statistics) =

In probability theory and statistics, coherence can have several different meanings. Coherence in statistics is an indication of the quality of the information, either within a single data set, or between similar but not identical data sets. Fully coherent data are logically consistent and can be reliably combined for analysis.

== In probability ==
When dealing with personal probability assessments, or supposed probabilities derived in nonstandard ways, it is a property of self-consistency across a whole set of such assessments.

=== In gambling strategy ===
One way of expressing such self-consistency is in terms of responses to various betting propositions, as described in relation to coherence (philosophical gambling strategy).

=== In Bayesian decision theory ===
The coherency principle in Bayesian decision theory is the assumption that subjective probabilities follow the ordinary rules/axioms of probability calculations (where the validity of these rules corresponds to the self-consistency just referred to) and thus that consistent decisions can be obtained from these probabilities.

== In time series analysis ==
In time series analysis, and particularly in spectral analysis, it is used to describe the strength of association between two series where the possible dependence between the two series is not limited to simultaneous values but may include leading, lagged and smoothed relationships.

The concepts here are sometimes known as coherency and are essentially those set out for coherence as for signal processing. However, note that the quantity coefficient of coherence may sometimes be called the squared coherence.
