= Scheirer–Ray–Hare test =

The Scheirer–Ray–Hare (SRH) test is a statistical test that can be used to examine whether a measure is affected by two or more factors. Since it does not require a normal distribution of the data, it is one of the non-parametric methods. It is an extension of the Kruskal–Wallis test, the non-parametric equivalent for one-way analysis of variance (ANOVA), to the application for more than one factor. It is thus a non-parametric alternative to multi-factorial ANOVA analyses. The test is named after James Scheirer, William Ray and Nathan Hare, who published it in 1976.

== Test description ==
The Scheirer–Ray–Hare test is analogous to the parametric multi-factorial ANOVA of investigating the influence of two different factors on a measure for which different samples are available for the factors. As with the parametric analysis of variance, the test can be used to investigate the null hypotheses that the two factors examined in each case have no influence on the positional parameter of the samples and thus on the measure, and that there are no interactions between the two factors. A p-value less than 0.05 for one or more of these three hypotheses leads to their rejection. As with many other non-parametric methods, the analysis in this method relies on the evaluation of the ranks of the samples in the samples rather than the actual observations. Modifications also allow extending the test to examine more than two factors.

The test strength of the Scheirer–Ray–Hare test, i.e. the probability of actually finding a statistically significant result, is significantly lower than that of the parametric multi-factorial ANOVA, so that it is considered more conservative in comparison of both methods. For this reason, and because the method was described later than most other parametric and non-parametric variance analysis tests, it has found little use in textbooks and statistical analysis software. With computer programs that contain a function for parametric multi-factorial ANOVA, however, with additional manual effort and a calculation of the Scheirer Ray Hare test is possible.

Since the Scheirer–Ray–Hare test only makes a statement about the diversity of all samples considered, it makes sense to perform a post-hoc test that compares the individual samples in pairs.

== Alternative procedures ==
The parametric alternative to the Scheirer–Ray–Hare test is multi-factorial ANOVA, which requires a normal distribution of data within the samples. The Kruskal–Wallis test, from which the Scheirer–Ray–Hare test is derived, serves in contrast to this to investigate the influence of exactly one factor on the measured variable. A non-parametric test comparing exactly two unpaired samples is the Wilcoxon–Mann–Whitney test.

== Literature ==
- Robert R. Sokal, F. James Rohlf: Biometry: The Principles And Practice of Statistics In Biological Research. Third edition. Freeman, New York 1995, ISBN 0-71-672411-1, pp. 445–447
