= Policy capturing =

Policy capturing or "the PC technique" is a statistical method used in social psychology to quantify the relationship between a person's judgement and the information that was used to make that judgement. Policy capturing assessments rely upon regression analysis models. Policy capturing is frequently used by businesses to assess employee performance.

Policy capturing is a technique that is used to examine how individuals reach decisions. Policy capturing is regarded as a form of judgment analysis and has been applied to a variety of settings and contexts.

A typical example was reported by Sherer, Schwab and Heneman (1987), in their study of how supervisors, in the setting of a private hospital, reach decisions about salary raises. Participants of this study, called judges, received information about a set of employees. The employees differed on five key factors: performance level was average or superior, performance was consistent or inconsistent, current salary was low, medium, or high, and the individuals either had or had not been offered another job from a different organization. After reading information about each employee, participants then decided whether the percentage and absolute increase in salary they would recommend. Which of these five factors shaped the decisions varied appreciably across the participants.

Hitt and Barr reported other examples of policy capturing. This study assessed which factors determine evaluations of job applicants and corresponding salaries. The participants or judges-66 managers who often need to reach similar decisions in their work lives-read the applications of these applicants and watched a video presentation that each candidate had prepared. Several variables differed across applicants: the applicants, for example, had accumulated either 10 or 15 years of experience, were 35 or 35 years of age, were male or female, were African or Caucasian, had completed a BS or MBA, and were applying to be a regional sales manager or vice president of sales. Subsequent analysis showed that factors unrelated to experience, such as age and sex, affected decisions. Furthermore, the relevance of each factor interacted with one another.

== See also ==
- Linear programming
- Statistics
- Analysis
- Regression analysis
- Mathematical modelling
