= Probabilistic proposition =

A probabilistic proposition is a proposition with a measured probability of being true for an arbitrary person at an arbitrary time. They may be contrasted with deterministic propositions, which assert that something is certain with no element of chance. Probabilistic proportions may be either categorical or conditional.
