= Civic statistics =

Civic statistics is a sub-discipline of statistics focused on the analysis of evidence relevant to understanding and addressing issues of public concern such as human migration, poverty and inequality. It lies at the intersection of politics, social science, statistics, and education.

== Background ==
In an increasingly complex world, the engagement of individuals and civil society groups is a fundamental resource in public decision-making at international, national and local levels. Drawing on the terms “statistical literacy”, “critical statistical literacy” and “data literacy”, the focus of Civic Statistics is on making sense of statistical information that provides information about social processes, social and economic well-being and the exercise of rights as citizens. Sustainable skills in the field of civic statistics are necessary for informed participation in democratic societies. Data on important societal issues is increasingly accessible to the general public and individual citizens or social action groups (e.g. on topics such as immigration, the labor market, social (in)equality, climate change, health). Understanding such topics is essential for civic engagement in modern societies.

== History ==
There is a long history of advocacy for the role of evidence to promote social. Marquis de Condorcet’s notion of savoir liberateur – knowledge that empowers people to liberate themselves from social oppression - provides an example; William Playfair‘s Political and Commercial Atlas (1786) is an early publication designed to make complex evidence accessible to a wide audience; John Snow and Florence Nightingale both used powerful graphical displays to address problems associated with disease; the Otto Neurath's work on Isotype (picture language) set out to establish a universal graphical language for communicating about social issues.

Humans have always lived in uncertain times, and have made decisions in the light of imperfect data. Recently, there has been a dramatic increase in the volume and nature of data available, in the tools available for display and analysis, and in the ways information is communicated. In parallel, there has been a growing disdain for robust evidence – illustrated by notions of a ‘post truth’ era; and descriptions of journalists as enemies of the people.

== Applications ==
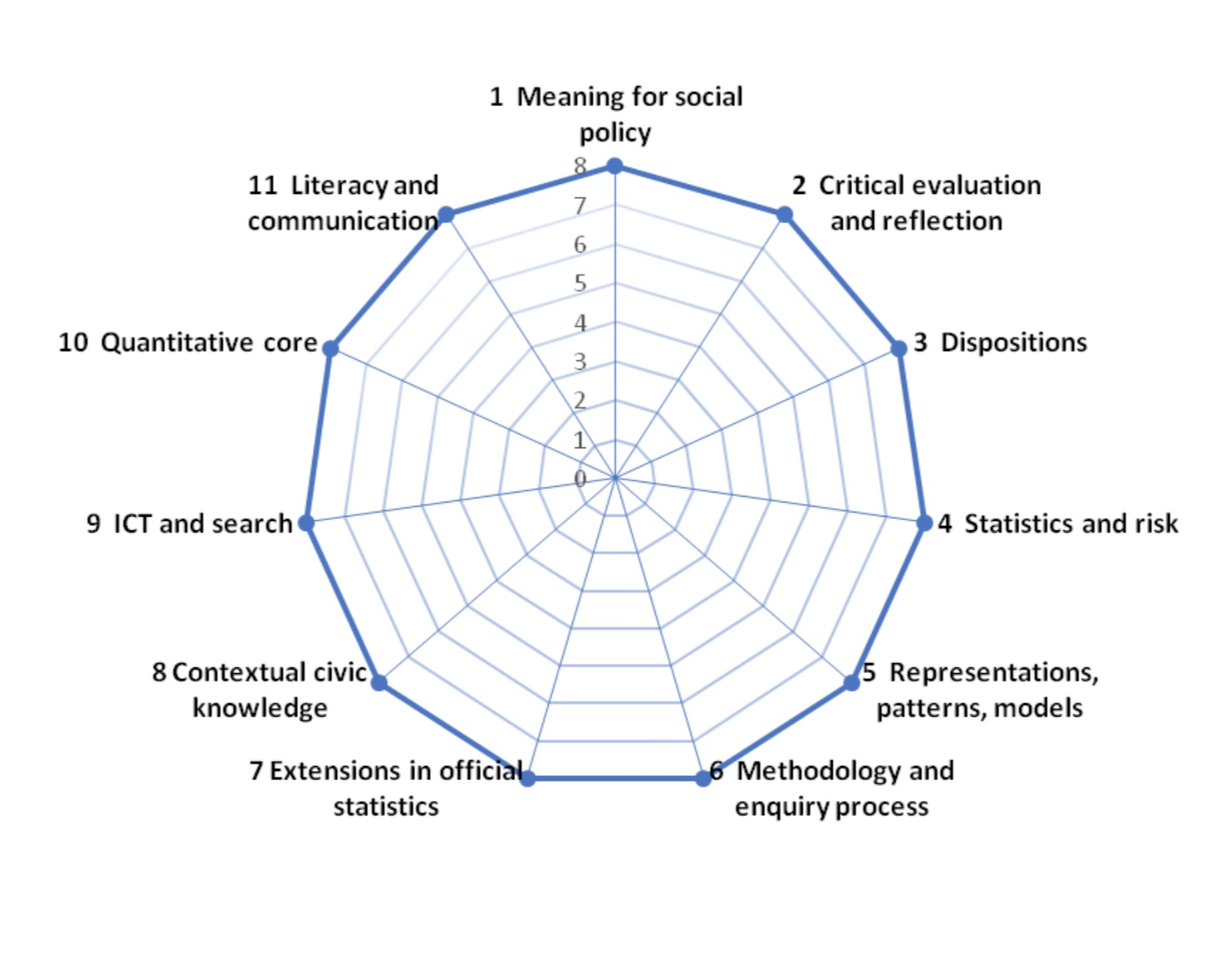
Here are described some facets of statistical literacy that underpin the ability to engage with statistics about social issues – i.e. Civic Statistics.

Data that can be used to inform social policy are complex. Data are often multivariate; aggregated data and indicator systems are common; variables interact; data may be time critical. There is a core set of ideas associated with literacy and numeracy that are essential to functioning in society, such as reading skills, understanding arguments, reading graphs and handling percentages. Beyond this citizens need to do more than understand data – they need to see the implications for society and policy. This requires knowledge about the processes of knowledge generation, and ways to represent and model situations, along with ideas commonly taught in statistics courses such as sample bias and inference. It also requires contextual knowledge the state of society (e.g. the percentage of tax revenue spent on healthcare). Civic statistics aims to empower citizens and policy makers by addressing the central issues associated with evidence-informed decision making. These include: developing a sophisticated approach to questions of data provenance and data quality; understanding the uses and abuses of a wide range of methods for presenting and analysing social data from a variety of sources; ways to represent and model situations; understanding risk; and appropriate advocacy.
