= Energy statistics =

Energy statistics may refer to:

- E-statistics, a class of tests and statistics built upon Euclidean distances, created by Gábor Székely
- Statistical study of energy data, statistics applied to the field of energy
