= Mazziotta–Pareto index =

The Mazziotta–Pareto index (MPI) is a composite index (OECD, 2008) for summarizing a set of individual indicators that are assumed to be not fully substitutable. It is based on a non-linear function which, starting from the arithmetic mean of the normalized indicators, introduces a penalty for the units with unbalanced values of the indicators (De Muro et al., 2011). Two version of the index have been proposed: (a) MPI, and (b) adjusted MPI (AMPI). The first version is the best solution for a 'static' analysis (e.g., a single-year analysis), whereas the second one is the best solution for a 'dynamic' analysis (e.g., a multi-year analysis). For a comparison between the two versions, see Mazziotta and Pareto (2015).

== MPI ==
Given the matrix $Y=y_{ij}$ with n rows (statistical units) and m columns (individual indicators), we calculate the normalized matrix $Z=z_{ij}$ as follows:

$$z_{ij}=100\pm[(y_{ij}-M_{y_j})S_{y_j}^{-1}]10$$

where $M_{y_j}$ and $S_{y_j}$ are, respectively, the mean and standard deviation of the indicator $j$ and the sign $\pm$ is the 'polarity' of the indicator $j$, i.e., the sign of the relation between the indicator $j$ and the phenomenon to be measured ($+$ if the individual indicator represents a dimension considered positive and $-$ if it represents a dimension considered negative). Denoting with $M_{z_i}$,$S_{z_i}$,$cv_{z_i}$, respectively, the mean, standard deviation, and coefficient of variation of the normalized values for unit $i$, the composite index is given by

$$\mathrm{MPI}_i^\pm =M_{z_i} (1\pm cv_{z_i}^2)=M_{z_i}\pm S_{z_i} cv_{z_i}$$

where the sign $\pm$ depends on the kind of phenomenon to be measured. If the composite index is 'increasing' or 'positive', i.e., increasing values of the index correspond to positive variations of the phenomenon (e.g., socio-economic development), then $\mathrm{MPI}^{-}$ is used. On the contrary, if the composite index is 'decreasing' or 'negative', i.e., increasing values of the index correspond to negative variations of the phenomenon (e.g., poverty), then $\mathrm{MPI}^{+}$ is used. In any cases, an unbalance among indicators will have a negative effect on the value of the index.

== AMPI ==
Given the matrix $Y=y_{ij}$, we calculate the matrix $R=\{r_{ij}\}$ as follows:

$$r_{ij}= \left[\left(y_{ij}-\min_i y_i\right)\left(\max_i y_i - \min_i y_i \right)^{-1} \right] 60+70$$

where $\min_i y_i$ and $\max_i y_i$ are the 'goalposts' for the indicator $j$, i.e., a minimum and a maximum value that represent the possible range of the indicator $j$ for all time periods considered. If the indicator $j$ has negative 'polarity', the complement of (1) with respect to 200 is calculated.

To facilitate the interpretation of results, the 'goalposts' can be chosen so that 100 represents a reference value (e.g., the average in a given year). Let $\inf_j y_j$ and $\sup_j y_j$ be the minimum and maximum of indicator $j$ across all time periods considered, and $\operatorname{Ref}_{y_j}$ be the reference value for indicator $j$. Then the 'goalposts' are defined as: ${\operatorname{Ref}_{y_j}}\pm \Delta$, where $\Delta=(\sup_j y_j-\inf_j y_j) 2^{-1}$

Denoting with $M_{r_i}$,$S_{r_i}$,$cv_{r_i}$, respectively, the mean, standard deviation, and coefficient of variation of the normalized values for unit $i$, the composite index is given by

$$\mathrm{AMPI}_i^\pm = M_{r_i} (1\pm cv_{r_i}^2)=M_{r_i}\pm S_{r_i} cv_{r_i}$$

where the sign $\pm$ depends on the kind of phenomenon to be measured.

== Applications ==
The methodology is usually applied to the calculation of both composite indices of “positive” multidimensional phenomena (the higher the value the better the performance), such as well-being (Istat, 2015), quality of life (Mazziotta and Pareto, 2012), development (De Muro et al., 2011) and infrastructural endowment (Mazziotta and Pareto, 2009), and for “negative” multidimensional phenomena (the higher the value the worse the performance), such as poverty (De Muro et al., 2011).
