= Barber–Johnson diagram =

A Barber–Johnson diagram is a method of presenting hospital statistics combining four different variables in a unique graph, introduced in 1973. The method constructs a scattergram where length of stay, turnover interval, discharges, and deaths per available bed are combined. These four variables have a common relationship between them and their combination in the diagram permitted a new improved way for analyzing efficiency and performance of the hospital sector. The most complete reference about how to construct the diagram could be found in Yates. In this book, the appendix explains in detail the way for elaborating this kind of diagram.
