= Inherent zero =

Reference point in statistics

In statistics, an inherent zero is a reference point used to describe data sets which are indicative of magnitude of an absolute or relative nature. Inherent zeros are used in the "ratio level" of "levels of measurement" and imply "none".
