= Bartlett's theorem =

Seminar Theories

In queueing theory, Bartlett's theorem gives the distribution of the number of customers in a given part of a system at a fixed time.

== Theorem ==
Suppose that customers arrive according to a non-stationary Poisson process with rate $A(t)$, and that subsequently they move independently around a system of nodes. Write $E$ for some particular part of the system and $p(s,t)$ the probability that a customer who arrives at time $s$ is in $E$ at time $t$. Then the number of customers in $E$ at time $t$ has a Poisson distribution with mean

$$\mu(t) = \int_{-\infty}^t A(s) p(s,t) \, \mathrm{d}s.$$
