= Separation test =

A separation test is a statistical procedure for early-phase research, to decide whether to pursue further research. It is designed to avoid the prevalent situation in early-phase research, when a statistically underpowered test gives a negative result.

== Readings ==
- Aickin M. (2004) "Separation Tests for Early-Phase Complementary and Alternative Medicine Comparative Trials". Evidence-Based Integrative Medicine, 1(4), 225–231
