= Square root biased sampling =

Square root biased sampling is a sampling method proposed by William H. Press, a computer scientist and computational biologist, for use in airport screenings. It is the mathematically optimal compromise between simple random sampling and strong profiling that most quickly finds a rare malfeasor, given fixed screening resources.

Using this method, if a group is $n$ times as likely as the average to be a security risk, then persons from that group will be $\sqrt{n}$ times as likely to undergo additional screening. For example, if someone from a profiled group is nine times more likely than the average person to be a security risk, then when using square root biased sampling, people from the profiled group would be screened three times more often than the average person.

== History ==
Press developed square root biased sampling as a way to sample long sequences of DNA. It had also been developed independently by Ruben Abagyan, a professor at TSRI in La Jolla, California, for use in a different biological context. An even earlier discovery was by Martin L. Shooman, who used square root biased sampling in a test apportionment model for software reliability.

Press' later proposal to use square root biased sampling for airport security was published in 2009. There, he argued that this method would be a more efficient use of the limited resources possessed for screening, as compared to the current practice, which can lead to screening the same persons frequently and repeatedly. However, use of this method presupposes that those doing the screening have accurate statistical information on who is more likely to be a security risk, which is not necessarily the case.

== See also ==
- Numerical Recipes, a series of books on algorithms and numerical analysis coauthored by William Press.
