= Marginal model =

In statistics, marginal models (Heagerty & Zeger, 2000) are a technique for obtaining regression estimates in multilevel modeling, also called hierarchical linear models. People often want to know the effect of a predictor/explanatory variable X, on a response variable Y. One way to get an estimate for such effects is through regression analysis.

== Why the name marginal model? ==
In a typical multilevel model, there are level 1 & 2 residuals (R and U variables). The two variables form a joint distribution for the response variable ($Y_{ij}$). In a marginal model, we collapse over the level 1 & 2 residuals and thus marginalize (see also conditional probability) the joint distribution into a univariate normal distribution. We then fit the marginal model to data.

For example, for the following hierarchical model,

level 1: $Y_{ij} = \beta_{0j} + R_{ij}$, the residual is $R_{ij}$, and $\operatorname{var}(R_{ij}) = \sigma^2$

level 2: $\beta_{0j} = \gamma_{00} + U_{0j}$, the residual is $U_{0j}$, and $\operatorname{var}(U_{0j}) = \tau_0^2$

Thus, the marginal model is,

$$Y_{ij} \sim N(\gamma_{00},(\tau_0^2+\sigma^2))$$

This model is what is used to fit to data in order to get regression estimates.
