= Order of a kernel =

In statistics, the order of a kernel is the degree of the first non-zero moment of a kernel.

== Definitions ==
Let $\ell \geq 1$ be an integer. Then, $K: \mathbb{R} \rightarrow \mathbb{R}$ is a kernel of order $\ell$ if the functions $u\mapsto u^{j}K(u), ~ j=0,1,...,\ell$ are integrable and satisfy $\int K(u)du=1, ~ \int u^{j}K(u)du=0,~ ~j=1,...,\ell.$
