= Signal-to-noise statistic =

In mathematics the signal-to-noise statistic distance between two vectors a and b with mean values $\mu _a$ and $\mu _b$ and standard deviation $\sigma _a$ and $\sigma _b$ respectively is:

$$D_{sn} = {(\mu _a - \mu _b) \over (\sigma _a + \sigma _b)}$$

In the case of Gaussian-distributed data and unbiased class distributions, this statistic can be related to classification accuracy given an ideal linear discrimination, and a decision boundary can be derived.

This distance is frequently used to identify vectors that have significant difference. One usage is in bioinformatics to locate genes that are differential expressed on microarray experiments.

== See also ==
- Distance
- Uniform norm
- Manhattan distance
- Signal-to-noise ratio
- Signal to noise ratio (imaging)
