= Lambda distribution =

The lambda distribution is either of two probability distributions used in statistics:

- Tukey's lambda distribution is a shape-conformable distribution used to identify an appropriate common distribution family to fit a collection of data to.
- Wilks' lambda distribution is an extension of Snedecor's F-distribution for matrices used in multivariate hypothesis testing, especially with regard to the likelihood-ratio test and multivariate analysis of variance.
