= Network probability matrix =

The network probability matrix describes the probability structure of a network based on the historical presence or absence of edges in a network. For example, individuals in a social network are not connected to other individuals with uniform random probability. The probability structure is much more complex. Intuitively, there are some people whom a person will communicate with or be connected more closely than others. For this reason, real-world networks tend to have clusters or cliques of nodes that are more closely related than others (Albert and Barabasi, 2002, Carley [year], Newmann 2003). This can be simulated by varying the probabilities that certain nodes will communicate. The network probability matrix was originally proposed by Ian McCulloh.
