= Q-statistic =

The Q-statistic or q-statistic is a test statistic:

- The Box-Pierce test outputs a Q-statistic (uppercase) which follows the chi-squared distribution
  - The Ljung-Box test is a modified version of the Box-Pierce test which provides better small sample properties
- The Tukey-Kramer test outputs a q-statistic (lowercase), also called the studentized range statistic, which follows the studentized range distribution
