= Principal geodesic analysis =

In geometric data analysis and statistical shape analysis, principal geodesic analysis is a generalization of principal component analysis to a non-Euclidean, non-linear setting of manifolds suitable for use with shape descriptors such as medial representations.
