= M-separation =

Measure of disconnectedness in statistics

In statistics, m-separation is a measure of disconnectedness in ancestral graphs and a generalization of d-separation for directed acyclic graphs. It is the opposite of m-connectedness.

Suppose G is an ancestral graph. For given source and target nodes s and t and a set Z of nodes in G\{s, t}, m-connectedness can be defined as follows. Consider a path from s to t. An intermediate node on the path is called a collider if both edges on the path touching it are directed toward the node. The path is said to m-connect the nodes s and t, given Z, if and only if:

- every non-collider on the path is outside Z, and
- for each collider c on the path, either c is in Z or there is a directed path from c to an element of Z.

If s and t cannot be m-connected by any path satisfying the above conditions, then the nodes are said to be m-separated.

The definition can be extended to node sets S and T. Specifically, S and T are m-connected if each node in S can be m-connected to any node in T, and are m-separated otherwise.

== See also ==
- d-separation
