= SCORUS =

An acronym for "Standing Committee of Regional and Urban Statistics", SCORUS is a sub-committee of the International Association for Official Statistics (IAOS) which is a section of the International Statistical Institute. The sub-committee has specific responsibility for regional and urban statistics and research. Its members form a dedicated international network of persons interested in regional and urban statistical issues.
