= Standardized rate =

Standardized rates are a statistical measure of any rates in a population. These are adjusted rates that take into account the vital differences between populations that may affect their birthrates or death rates.

== Examples ==
The most common are birth, death and unemployment rates. For example, in a community made up of primarily young couples, the birthrate might appear to be high when compared to that of other populations. However, by calculating the standardized birthrates that is by comparing the same age group in other populations), a more realistic picture of childbearing capacity will be developed.

== Formula ==
The formula for standardized rates is as follows:

Σ(crude rate for age group × standard population for age group) / Σstandard population

== See also ==
- Mortality ratio
