= Double exponential distribution =

In statistics, the double exponential distribution may refer to

- Laplace distribution, or bilateral exponential distribution, consisting of two exponential distributions glued together on each side of a threshold
- Gumbel distribution, the cumulative distribution function of which is an iterated exponential function (the exponential of an exponential function).
