= Generalized multidimensional scaling =

Generalized multidimensional scaling (GMDS) is an extension of metric multidimensional scaling, in which the target space is non-Euclidean. When the dissimilarities are distances on a surface and the target space is another surface, GMDS allows finding the minimum-distortion embedding of one surface into another.

GMDS is an emerging research direction. Currently, main applications are recognition of deformable objects (e.g. for three-dimensional face recognition) and texture mapping.
