= Assumed mean =

Method of calculation of arithmetic mean

In statistics, the assumed mean is a method for calculating the arithmetic mean and standard deviation of a data set. It simplifies calculating accurate values by hand. Its interest today is chiefly historical but it can be used to quickly estimate these statistics. There are other rapid calculation methods which are more suited for computers which also ensure more accurate results than the obvious methods. It is in a sense an algorithm.

== Example ==
First: The mean of the following numbers is sought:

219, 223, 226, 228, 231, 234, 235, 236, 240, 241, 244, 247, 249, 255, 262

Suppose we start with a plausible initial guess that the mean is about 240. Then the deviations from this "assumed" mean are the following:

−21, −17, −14, −12, −9, −6, −5, −4, 0, 1, 4, 7, 9, 15, 22

In adding these up, one finds that:

22 and −21 almost cancel, leaving +1,
15 and −17 almost cancel, leaving −2,
9 and −9 cancel,
7 + 4 cancels −6 − 5,

and so on. We are left with a sum of −30. The average of these 15 deviations from the assumed mean is therefore −30/15 = −2. Therefore, that is what we need to add to the assumed mean to get the correct mean:

correct mean = 240 − 2 = 238.

== Method ==
The method depends on estimating the mean and rounding to an easy value to calculate with. This value is then subtracted from all the sample values. When the samples are classed into equal size ranges a central class is chosen and the count of ranges from that is used in the calculations. For example, for people's heights a value of 1.75m might be used as the assumed mean.

For a data set with assumed mean x_{0} suppose:

$$d_i=x_i-x_0 \,$$
$$A = \sum_{i=1}^N d_i \,$$
$$B = \sum_{i=1}^N d_i^2 \,$$
$$D = \frac{A}{N} \,$$

Then

$$\overline{x} = x_0 + D \,$$

$$\sigma = \sqrt{\frac{B - N D^2}{N}} \,$$

or for a sample standard deviation using Bessel's correction:

$$\sigma = \sqrt{\frac{ B -  N D^2}{N-1}}  \,$$

== Example using class ranges ==
Where there are a large number of samples a quick reasonable estimate of the mean and standard deviation can be got by grouping the samples into classes using equal size ranges. This introduces a quantization error but is normally accurate enough for most purposes if 10 or more classes are used.

For instance with the exception,

167.8 175.4 176.1 166 174.7 170.2 178.9 180.4 174.6 174.5 182.4 173.4 167.4 170.7 180.6 169.6 176.2 176.3 175.1 178.7 167.2 180.2 180.3 164.7 167.9 179.6 164.9 173.2 180.3 168 175.5 172.9 182.2 166.7 172.4 181.9 175.9 176.8 179.6 166 171.5 180.6 175.5 173.2 178.8 168.3 170.3 174.2 168 172.6 163.3 172.5 163.4 165.9 178.2 174.6 174.3 170.5 169.7 176.2 175.1 177 173.5 173.6 174.3 174.4 171.1 173.3 164.6 173 177.9 166.5 159.6 170.5 174.7 182 172.7 175.9 171.5 167.1 176.9 181.7 170.7 177.5 170.9 178.1 174.3 173.3 169.2 178.2 179.4 187.6 186.4 178.1 174 177.1 163.3 178.1 179.1 175.6

The minimum and maximum are 159.6 and 187.6 we can group them as follows rounding the numbers down. The class size (CS) is 3. The assumed mean is the centre of the range from 174 to 177 which is 175.5. The differences are counted in classes.

Observed numbers in ranges
| Range | tally-count | frequency | class diff | freq×diff | freq×diff^{2} |
|---|---|---|---|---|---|
| 159—161 | / | 1 | −5 | −5 | 25 |
| 162—164 | ~~////~~ / | 6 | −4 | −24 | 96 |
| 165—167 | ~~////~~ ~~////~~ | 10 | −3 | −30 | 90 |
| 168—170 | ~~////~~ ~~////~~ /// | 13 | −2 | −26 | 52 |
| 171—173 | ~~////~~ ~~////~~ ~~////~~ / | 16 | −1 | −16 | 16 |
| 174—176 | ~~////~~ ~~////~~ ~~////~~ ~~////~~ ~~////~~ | 25 | 0 | 0 | 0 |
| 177—179 | ~~////~~ ~~////~~ ~~////~~ / | 16 | 1 | 16 | 16 |
| 180—182 | ~~////~~ ~~////~~ / | 11 | 2 | 22 | 44 |
| 183—185 | | 0 | 3 | 0 | 0 |
| 186—188 | // | 2 | 4 | 8 | 32 |
| Sum | | N = 100 | | A = −55 | B = 371 |

The mean is then estimated to be

$$x_0 + CS \times \frac{A}{N} = 175.5+3\times -55 / 100 = 173.85$$

which is very close to the actual mean of 173.846.

The standard deviation is estimated as

$$CS \sqrt{\frac{B-\frac{A^2}{N}}{N-1}}=5.57$$
