= Tetrachoric correlation =

Measure of association

The tetrachoric correlation coefficient is a measure of association between two dichotomous variables. It is based on the assumption that the observed binary variables arise by dichotomizing two underlying continuous variables that follow a normal distribution. The dichotomization may result from measurement design, categorization, or other practical considerations.

The coefficient can be interpreted as the Pearson correlation coefficient that would be obtained between the two underlying continuous, normally distributed variables if their values were observable.

== Calculation ==
Suppose that the observed values of two dichotomous variables, X and Y, are summarized in the following 2 × 2 contingency table, where the entries denote cell frequencies:

	y = 1	y = 0	total
x = 1	$a$	$b$	$a+b$
x = 0	$c$	$d$	$c+d$
total	$a+c$	$b+d$	$n$

Determining the exact value of the tetrachoric correlation coefficient from sample data requires fairly numerically complex calculations. One must find $\hat{\rho}$ using the following equation:

$$\frac{d}{n} = \int_{\hat{h}}^{\infty}\int_{\hat{k}}^{\infty}\frac{1}{2\pi\left(1-\hat{\rho}^2\right)^{1/2}}\text{exp}\left[\frac{-\left(x^2-2\hat{\rho}xy+y^2 \right)}{2\left(1- \hat{\rho}^2 \right)}\right]dy\text{ }dx$$,

where $\hat{h} = \Phi^{-1} \left( \frac{a+c}{n} \right)$ and $\hat{k} = \Phi^{-1} \left( \frac{a+b}{n} \right)$.

In 2005, Bonett and Price proposed a simplified formula that yields an estimate with good properties:

$$\hat{\rho}^{*} = \cos\left(\frac{\pi}{1+\hat{\omega}^{\hat{c}}}\right)$$,

where: $\pi$ is the number π, $\hat{c}$ is determined by the following formula:

$$\hat{c} = \frac{1}{2} \left(1-\frac{|b-c|}{5(n+2)}-\left(\frac{1}{2}-\frac{\min(a+b;a+c;b+d;c+d)+1}{n+2}\right)^2\right),$$

and $\hat{\omega}$ is an estimate of the odds ratio using the contingency table cell counts increased by 0.5:

$$\hat{\omega} = \frac{(a+0.5)(d+0.5)}{(b+0.5)(c+0.5)}$$.

== See also ==
- Polychoric correlation

== Bibliography ==
- Why so many Correlation Coefficients
- Bruce M. King, Edward W. Minium, Statistical Reasoning in Psychology and Education, 2003, p. 146.
