= Line-intercept sampling =

Method of sampling in biostatistics

Click to see animation of line-intercept sampling.

In statistics, more specifically in biostatistics, line-intercept sampling (LIS) is a method of sampling elements in a region whereby an element is sampled if a chosen line segment, called a “transect”, intersects the element.

Line intercept sampling has proven to be a reliable, versatile, and easy to implement method to analyze an area containing various objects of interest. It has recently also been applied to estimating variances during particulate material sampling.

== See also ==
- Sampling (statistics)
