= Relative index of inequality =

Economic measure applied to healthcare

The relative index of inequality (RII) is a regression-based index which summarizes the magnitude of socio-economic status (SES) as a source of inequalities in health. RII is useful because it takes into account the size of the population and the relative disadvantage experienced by different groups. The disease outcome is regressed on the proportion of the population that has a higher position in the hierarchy.

The RII is particularly valuable when comparing risk factors (independent variables) that are on very different scales (e.g. low SES, low IQ, cigarette smoking). The RII is calculated in the following way:

1. Rank cases on each of the variables
2. For tied ranks and for categorical variables, assign the mean rank
3. Divide the ranks by the sample size, creating a value ranging from 0 to 1

== Interpretation of RII ==
The interpretation of RII is similar to the relative risk. It summarizes the relative risk for the most advantaged group (at the top of the hierarchy) compared to the least advantaged group (at the bottom of the hierarchy). This interpretation assumes that the variables have been scored so that higher scores are consistent with increased risk. For example, an RII of 1.88 (95% confidence intervals 1.27 to 2.77), an indicator of low SES, on the risk of long term illness, implies that those in the most deprived group are 1.88 times more likely to experience illness than those in the least deprived group.

== Limitations of RII ==
One disadvantage of the RII is that it may capitalize on skewed data, inflating the apparent relative risk. A second limitation is that a large RII may arise for two reasons. First, it may represent a large effect of SES on disease. Second, it may reflect large differences between those with the most SES and those with the least (i.e. large inequalities in SES itself).
