= Matrix F-distribution =

Multivariate continuous probability distribution

Matrix $F$
- Notation: $\mathcal{F}({\mathbf\Psi},\nu,\delta)$
- Parameters: $\mathbf{\Psi} > 0$, $p\times p$ scale matrix (pos. def.) $\nu > p-1$ degrees of freedom (real) $\delta > 0$ degrees of freedom (real)
- Support: $\mathbf{X}$ is p × p positive definite matrix
- PDF: $\frac{\Gamma_p\left(\frac{\nu+\delta+p-1}{2}\right)}{\Gamma_p\left(\frac{\nu}{2}\right)\Gamma_p\left(\frac{\delta+p-1}{2}\right)|\mathbf{\Psi}|^{\frac{\nu}{2}}}~|{\mathbf X}|^{\frac{\nu-p-1}{2}} |\textbf{I}_p+{\mathbf X}\mathbf{\Psi}^{-1}|^{-\frac{\nu+\delta+p-1}{2}}$: $\Gamma_p$ is the multivariate gamma function; $\textbf{I}_p$ is the p × p identity matrix
- Mean: $\tfrac{\nu}{\delta - 2}\mathbf{\Psi}$, for $\delta > 2.$
- Variance: see below

In statistics, the matrix F distribution (or matrix variate F distribution) is a matrix variate generalization of the F distribution which is defined on real-valued positive-definite matrices. In Bayesian statistics it can be used as the semi conjugate prior for the covariance matrix or precision matrix of multivariate normal distributions, and related distributions.

== Density ==
The probability density function of the matrix $F$ distribution is:

$f_{\mathbf X}({\mathbf X}; {\mathbf \Psi}, \nu, \delta) = \frac{\Gamma_p\left(\frac{\nu+\delta+p-1}{2}\right)}{\Gamma_p\left(\frac{\nu}{2}\right)\Gamma_p\left(\frac{\delta+p-1}{2}\right)|\mathbf{\Psi}|^{\frac{\nu}{2}}}~|{\mathbf X}|^{\frac{\nu-p-1}{2}} |\textbf{I}_p+{\mathbf X}\mathbf{\Psi}^{-1}|^{-\frac{\nu+\delta+p-1}{2}}$

where $\mathbf{X}$ and ${\mathbf\Psi}$ are $p\times p$ positive definite matrices, $| \cdot |$ is the determinant, Γ_{p}(⋅) is the multivariate gamma function, and $\textbf{I}_p$ is the p × p identity matrix.

== Properties ==
=== Construction of the distribution ===
- The standard matrix F distribution, with an identity scale matrix $\mathbf I_p$, was originally derived by. When considering independent distributions,

${\mathbf \Phi_1}\sim \mathcal{W}({\mathbf I_p},\nu)$ and ${\mathbf \Phi_2}\sim \mathcal{W}({\mathbf I_p},\delta+k-1)$, and define $\mathbf X = {\mathbf \Phi_2}^{-1/2}{\mathbf \Phi_1}{\mathbf \Phi_2}^{-1/2}$, then $\mathbf X\sim \mathcal{F}({\mathbf I_p},\nu,\delta)$.

- If ${\mathbf X}|\mathbf\Phi\sim \mathcal{W}^{-1}({\mathbf\Phi},\delta+p-1)$ and ${\mathbf \Phi}\sim \mathcal{W}({\mathbf\Psi},\nu)$, then, after integrating out $\mathbf\Phi$, $\mathbf X$ has a matrix F-distribution, i.e.,

$f_{\mathbf X | \mathbf\Phi, \nu, \delta}(\mathbf X) = \int f_{\mathbf X | \mathbf\Phi, \delta+p-1}(\mathbf X) f_{\mathbf\Phi | \mathbf\Psi, \nu}(\mathbf\Phi) d\mathbf\Phi.$
This construction is useful to construct a semi-conjugate prior for a covariance matrix.

- If ${\mathbf X}|\mathbf\Phi\sim \mathcal{W}({\mathbf\Phi},\nu)$ and ${\mathbf \Phi}\sim \mathcal{W}^{-1}({\mathbf\Psi},\delta+p-1)$, then, after integrating out $\mathbf\Phi$, $\mathbf X$ has a matrix F-distribution, i.e.,
  $f_{\mathbf X | \mathbf\Psi, \nu, \delta}(\mathbf X) = \int f_{\mathbf X | \mathbf\Phi, \nu}(\mathbf X) f_{\mathbf\Phi | \mathbf\Psi, \delta + p - 1}(\mathbf\Phi) d\mathbf\Phi.$
  This construction is useful to construct a semi-conjugate prior for a precision matrix.

=== Marginal distributions from a matrix F distributed matrix ===
Suppose ${\mathbf A}\sim F({\mathbf\Psi},\nu,\delta)$ has a matrix F distribution. Partition the matrices ${\mathbf A}$ and ${\mathbf\Psi}$ conformably with each other

$${\mathbf{A}} = \begin{bmatrix} \mathbf{A}_{11} & \mathbf{A}_{12} \\ \mathbf{A}_{21} & \mathbf{A}_{22} \end{bmatrix}, \;
{\mathbf{\Psi}} = \begin{bmatrix} \mathbf{\Psi}_{11} & \mathbf{\Psi}_{12} \\ \mathbf{\Psi}_{21} & \mathbf{\Psi}_{22} \end{bmatrix}$$

where ${\mathbf A_{ij}}$ and ${\mathbf \Psi_{ij}}$ are $p_{i}\times p_{j}$ matrices, then we have ${\mathbf A_{11} } \sim F({\mathbf \Psi_{11} }, \nu, \delta)$.

=== Moments ===
Let $X \sim F({\mathbf\Psi},\nu,\delta)$.

The mean is given by: $E(\mathbf X) = \frac{\nu}{\delta-2}\mathbf\Psi.$

The (co)variance of elements of $\mathbf{X}$ are given by:

$$\operatorname{cov}(X_{ij},X_{ml}) = \Psi_{ij}\Psi_{ml}\tfrac{2\nu^2+2\nu(\delta-2)}{(\delta-1)(\delta-2)^2(\delta-4)}
+ (\Psi_{il}\Psi_{jm}+\Psi_{im}\Psi_{jl})\left(\tfrac{2\nu+\nu^2(\delta-2)+\nu(\delta-2)}{(\delta-1)(\delta-2)^2(\delta-4)}+\tfrac{\nu}{(\delta-2)^2}\right).$$

== Related distributions ==
- The matrix F-distribution has also been termed the multivariate beta II distribution. See also, for a univariate version.
- A univariate version of the matrix F distribution is the F-distribution. With $p=1$ (i.e. univariate) and $\mathbf\Psi = 1$, and $x=\mathbf{X}$, the probability density function of the matrix F distribution becomes the univariate (unscaled) F distribution:
  $f_{x\mid\nu, \delta}(x) = \operatorname{B}\left(\tfrac{\nu}{2},\tfrac{\delta}{2}\right)^{-1} \left(\tfrac{\nu}{\delta}\right)^{\nu/2} x^{\nu/2 - 1} \left(1+\tfrac{\nu}{\delta} \, x \right)^{-(\nu+\delta)/2},$
- In the univariate case, with $p=1$ and $x=\mathbf{X}$, and when setting $\nu=1$, then $\sqrt{x}$ follows a half t distribution with scale parameter $\sqrt{\psi}$ and degrees of freedom $\delta$. The half t distribution is a common prior for standard deviations

== See also ==
- Inverse matrix gamma distribution
- Matrix normal distribution
- Wishart distribution
- Inverse Wishart distribution
- Complex inverse Wishart distribution
