= Matrix gamma distribution =

Generalization of gamma distribution

Matrix gamma
- Notation: ${\rm MG}_{p}(\alpha,\beta,\boldsymbol\Sigma)$
- Parameters: $\alpha > \frac{p-1}{2}$ shape parameter (real) $\beta > 0$ scale parameter $\boldsymbol\Sigma$ scale (positive-definite real $p\times p$ matrix)
- Support: $\mathbf{X}$ positive-definite real $p\times p$ matrix
- PDF: $\frac{|\boldsymbol\Sigma|^{-\alpha}}{\beta^{p\alpha}\,\Gamma_p(\alpha)} |\mathbf{X}|^{\alpha-\frac{p+1}{2}} \exp\left({\rm tr}\left(-\frac{1}{\beta}\boldsymbol\Sigma^{-1}\mathbf{X}\right)\right)$: $\Gamma_p$ is the multivariate gamma function.

In statistics, a matrix gamma distribution is a generalization of the gamma distribution to positive-definite matrices. It is effectively a different parametrization of the Wishart distribution, and is used similarly, e.g. as the conjugate prior of the precision matrix of a multivariate normal distribution and matrix normal distribution. The compound distribution resulting from compounding a matrix normal with a matrix gamma prior over the precision matrix is a generalized matrix t-distribution.

A matrix gamma distributions is identical to a Wishart distribution with $\beta \boldsymbol\Sigma = 2 V, \alpha=\frac{n}{2}.$

Notice that the parameters $\beta$ and $\boldsymbol\Sigma$ are not identified; the density depends on these two parameters through the product $\beta\boldsymbol\Sigma$.

== See also ==
- Inverse matrix gamma distribution
- Matrix normal distribution
- Matrix t-distribution
- Wishart distribution
