= Inverse matrix gamma distribution =

Probability distribution

Inverse matrix gamma
- Notation: ${\rm IMG}_{p}(\alpha,\beta,\boldsymbol\Psi)$
- Parameters: $\alpha > (p - 1)/2$ shape parameter $\beta > 0$ scale parameter $\boldsymbol\Psi$ scale (positive-definite real $p\times p$ matrix)
- Support: $\mathbf{X}$ positive-definite real $p\times p$ matrix
- PDF: $\frac{|\boldsymbol\Psi|^{\alpha}}{\beta^{p\alpha}\Gamma_p(\alpha)} |\mathbf{X}|^{-\alpha-(p+1)/2}\exp\left(-\frac{1}{\beta}{\rm tr}\left(\boldsymbol\Psi\mathbf{X}^{-1}\right)\right)$: $\Gamma_p$ is the multivariate gamma function.

In statistics, the inverse matrix gamma distribution is a generalization of the inverse gamma distribution to positive-definite matrices. It is a more general version of the inverse Wishart distribution, and is used similarly, e.g. as the conjugate prior of the covariance matrix of a multivariate normal distribution or matrix normal distribution. The compound distribution resulting from compounding a matrix normal with an inverse matrix gamma prior over the covariance matrix is a generalized matrix t-distribution.

This reduces to the inverse Wishart distribution with $\nu$ degrees of freedom when $\beta=2, \alpha=\frac{\nu}{2}$.

== See also ==
- inverse Wishart distribution.
- matrix gamma distribution.
- matrix normal distribution.
- matrix t-distribution.
- Wishart distribution.
