= Complex inverse Wishart distribution =

Complex inverse Wishart Distribution
- Notation: $\mathcal{CW}^{-1}({\mathbf\Psi},\nu,p)$
- Parameters: $\nu > p-1$ degrees of freedom (real) $\mathbf{\Psi} > 0$, $p\times p$ scale matrix (pos. def.)
- Support: $\mathbf{X}$ is p × p positive definite Hermitian
- PDF: $\frac{\left|\mathbf\Psi\right|^{\nu}}{\mathcal{C}\Gamma_p(\nu)} \left|\mathbf{x}\right|^{-(\nu+p)}e^{-\operatorname{tr}(\mathbf\Psi\mathbf{x}^{-1})}$: $\mathcal{C}\Gamma_p$ is the complex multivariate gamma function; $$\mathcal{C}\Gamma_p(\nu) = \pi^{\tfrac{1}{2}p(p-1)}\prod_{j=1}^p \Gamma(\nu-j+1)$$: $\operatorname{tr}$ is the trace function
- Mean: $\frac{\mathbf{\Psi}}{\nu - p }$ for $\nu > p + 1$
- Variance: see below

The complex inverse Wishart distribution is a matrix probability distribution defined on complex-valued positive-definite matrices and is the complex analog of the real inverse Wishart distribution. The complex Wishart distribution was extensively investigated by Goodman while the derivation of the inverse is shown by Shaman and others. It has greatest application in least squares optimization theory applied to complex valued data samples in digital radio communications systems, often related to Fourier Domain complex filtering.

Letting $\mathbf{S}_{p \times p} = \sum_{j=1}^\nu G_j G_j^H$ be the sample covariance of independent complex p-vectors $G_j$ whose Hermitian covariance has complex Wishart distribution $\mathbf{S} \sim \mathcal{CW}(\mathbf\Sigma,\nu,p)$ with mean value $\mathbf{\Sigma} \text{ and } \nu$ degrees of freedom, then the pdf of $\mathbf{X} = \mathbf{S^{-1}}$ follows the complex inverse Wishart distribution.

== Density ==
If $\mathbf{S}_{p \times p}$ is a sample from the complex Wishart distribution $\mathcal{CW}({\mathbf\Sigma},\nu,p)$ such that, in the simplest case, $\nu \ge p \text { and } \left| \mathbf{S} \right | > 0$ then $\mathbf{X} = \mathbf{S}^{-1}$ is sampled from the inverse complex Wishart distribution $\mathcal{CW}^{-1}({\mathbf\Psi},\nu,p) \text{ where } \mathbf\Psi = \mathbf{\Sigma}^{-1}$.

The density function of $\mathbf{X}$ is

$$f_{\mathbf{x}}(\mathbf{x}) = \frac{\left|\mathbf\Psi\right|^{\nu}}{\mathcal{C}\Gamma_p(\nu)} \left|\mathbf{x}\right|^{-(\nu+p)}e^{-\operatorname{tr}(\mathbf\Psi\mathbf{x}^{-1})}$$

where $\mathcal{C}\Gamma_p(\nu)$ is the complex multivariate Gamma function

$$\mathcal{C}\Gamma_p(\nu) = \pi^{\tfrac{1}{2}p(p-1)}\prod_{j=1}^p \Gamma(\nu-j+1)$$

== Moments ==
The variances and covariances of the elements of the inverse complex Wishart distribution are shown in Shaman's paper above while Maiwald and Kraus determine the 1-st through 4-th moments.

Shaman finds the first moment to be

$$\mathbf E [\mathcal C \mathbf { W^{-1} } ] = \frac{1}{n-p} \mathbf{ \Psi ^ {-1} }, \; n > p$$

and, in the simplest case $\mathbf\Psi = \mathbf I_{p \times p}$, given $d = \frac{1}{n - p}$, then

$$\mathbf {\mathbf E \left [vec( \mathcal C W _3^{-1} ) \right ]}  = \begin{bmatrix}
d  & 0 & 0 & 0 & d & 0 & 0 & 0 & d  \\
\end{bmatrix}$$

The vectorised covariance is

$$\mathbf {Cov \left [vec( \mathcal C W _p^{-1} ) \right ]}
= b \left( \mathbf I_p \otimes I_p \right ) + c \, \mathbf {vecI_p} \left (  \mathbf {vecI_p}  \right ) ^T
+ (a-b-c) \mathbf J$$

where $\mathbf J$ is a $p^2 \times p^2$ identity matrix with ones in diagonal positions $1 + (p + 1)j, \; j = 0,1,\dots p-1$ and $a, b, c$ are real constants such that for $n > p + 1$

$a = \frac{1}{(n - p)^2 (n-p-1)}$, marginal diagonal variances
$b = \frac{1}{(n - p + 1)(n - p) (n - p - 1)}$, off-diagonal variances.
$c = \frac{1}{(n - p + 1)(n - p)^2 (n - p - 1)}$, intra-diagonal covariances

For $\mathbf \Psi = \mathbf I _ 3$, we get the sparse matrix:

$$\mathbf {Cov \left [vec( \mathcal C W _3^{-1} ) \right ]}  = \begin{bmatrix}
a   & \cdot & \cdot & \cdot &     c   & \cdot & \cdot & \cdot &     c  \\
\cdot   &     b & \cdot & \cdot & \cdot   & \cdot & \cdot & \cdot & \cdot  \\
\cdot   & \cdot &     b & \cdot & \cdot   & \cdot & \cdot & \cdot & \cdot  \\
\cdot   & \cdot & \cdot &     b & \cdot   & \cdot & \cdot & \cdot & \cdot  \\
c   & \cdot & \cdot & \cdot &       a & \cdot & \cdot & \cdot &     c  \\
\cdot   & \cdot & \cdot & \cdot & \cdot   &     b & \cdot & \cdot & \cdot  \\
\cdot   & \cdot & \cdot & \cdot & \cdot   & \cdot &     b & \cdot & \cdot  \\
\cdot   & \cdot & \cdot & \cdot & \cdot   & \cdot & \cdot &     b & \cdot  \\
c   & \cdot & \cdot & \cdot &     c   & \cdot & \cdot & \cdot &      a \\
\end{bmatrix}$$

== Eigenvalue distributions ==
The joint distribution of the real eigenvalues of the inverse complex (and real) Wishart are found in Edelman's paper who refers back to an earlier paper by James. In the non-singular case, the eigenvalues of the inverse Wishart are simply the inverted values for the Wishart. Edelman also characterises the marginal distributions of the smallest and largest eigenvalues of complex and real Wishart matrices.
