= John Wishart (statistician) =

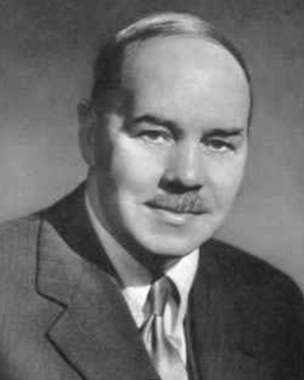
- Born: 28 November 1898; Montrose, Scotland
- Died: 14 July 1956 (aged 57); Acapulco, Mexico
- Education: University of Edinburgh; University of Cambridge; University College London
- Scientific career
- Workplaces: Rothamsted Experimental Station; University of Cambridge
- Doctoral advisor: Karl Pearson
- Doctoral students: M. S. Bartlett; William Gemmell Cochran; Herman Otto Hartley

John Wishart FRSE (28 November 1898 – 14 July 1956) was a Scottish mathematician and agricultural statistician.

He gave his name to the Wishart distribution in statistics.

== Life ==
Wishart was born at 24 Melville Lane in Montrose, Scotland on 28 November 1898, the son of Elizabeth Millar Scott of Edinburgh and John Wishart of Montrose. His father was a bespoke boot and shoe maker. The family moved from Montrose to Perth around 1903, living at 36 Robertsons Buildings on Barrack Street. He was educated at Perth Academy.

In the First World War he was conscripted into the Black Watch in 1917 and served two years in France.

He studied mathematics at the University of Edinburgh under Edmund Taylor Whittaker, graduating with an MA and BSc. He then went on to study at the University of Cambridge where he gained a further MA. He then gained a doctorate (DSc) at the University College London under Karl Pearson. After a year of teacher training at Moray College of Education in Edinburgh he then worked for two years as a Mathematics Teacher at West Leeds High School.

In 1927 he joined Rothamsted Experimental Station with Ronald Fisher, and then (from 1931) as a Reader in Statistics in the University of Cambridge where he became the first Director of the Statistical Laboratory in 1953. He was elected a Fellow of the Royal Society of Edinburgh in 1931, his proposers being Edmund Taylor Whittaker, Malcolm Laurie, Alexander Craig Aitken and Robert Schlapp.

He edited Biometrika from 1937. In 1950 he was elected as a Fellow of the American Statistical Association. He first formulated a generalised product-moment distribution named the Wishart distribution in his honour, in 1928.

In the Second World War he first served as a Captain in the Intelligence Corps then in 1942 became assistant secretary at the Admiralty.

Wishart drowned at the age of 57 on 14th July 1956, having suffered a stroke while swimming in the sea at Revolcadero Beach, Acapulco. He was in Acapulco as a representative of the Food and Agriculture Organization, and on a mission to set up a research centre.

== Publications ==
- Biometrika

== Family ==
In September 1924 he married Olive Pullan Birdsall at All Souls, Leeds. They had two sons, John Neil in 1928 and Phillip Keith in 1931, both born in St Albans, Hertfordshire.
