= Complex Wishart distribution =

Probability distribution on complex matrices

Complex Wishart
- Notation: A ~ CW_{p}($\Gamma$, n)
- Parameters: n > p − 1 degrees of freedom (real) $\Gamma$ > 0 (p × p Hermitian pos. def)
- Support: A (p × p) Hermitian positive definite matrix
- PDF: $\frac{ \det\left(\mathbf{A}\right)^{(n-p)} e^{-\operatorname{tr}(\mathbf{\Gamma}^{-1}\mathbf{A})} }{ \det\left(\mathbf{\Gamma}\right)^{n}\cdot \mathcal{C} \widetilde{\Gamma}_p(n) }$: $\mathcal{C}\widetilde{\mathbf{\Gamma}}_p$ is the $p$-variate complex multivariate gamma function; tr is the trace function
- Mean: $\operatorname{E}[A]=n\Gamma$
- Mode: $(n-p) \mathbf{\Gamma}$ for n ≥ p + 1
- CF: $\det\left(I_p-i\mathbf{\Gamma}\mathbf{\Theta}\right)^{-n}$

In statistics, the complex Wishart distribution is a complex version of the Wishart distribution. It is the distribution of $n$ times the sample Hermitian covariance matrix of $n$ zero-mean independent Gaussian random variables. It has support for $p\times p$ Hermitian positive definite matrices.

The complex Wishart distribution is also encountered in wireless communications, while analyzing the performance of Rayleigh fading MIMO wireless channels.

The complex Wishart distribution is the density of a complex-valued sample covariance matrix. Let

$$S_{p \times p} = \sum_{i=1}^n G_iG_i^H$$

where each $G_i$ is an independent column p-vector of random complex Gaussian zero-mean samples and $(.)^H$ is an Hermitian (complex conjugate) transpose. If the covariance of G is $\mathbb{E}[GG^H] = M$ then

$$S \sim n\mathcal{CW}(M,n,p)$$

where $\mathcal{CW}(M,n,p)$ is the complex central Wishart distribution with n degrees of freedom and mean value, or scale matrix, M.

$$f_S(\mathbf{S}) = \frac{
\left |\mathbf{S} \right|^{n-p} e^{-\operatorname{tr}(\mathbf M^{-1}\mathbf{S}) }
}
{
\left|\mathbf{M}\right|^n\cdot \mathcal{C} \widetilde{\Gamma}_p(n)
}, \;\;\;  n\ge p, \;\;\;  \left|\mathbf{M}\right| > 0$$

where

$$\mathcal{C} \widetilde{\Gamma}_p^{} (n) = \pi^{p(p-1)/2} \prod_{j=1}^p \Gamma (n-j+1)$$

is the complex multivariate Gamma function.

Using the trace rotation rule $\operatorname{tr}(ABC) = \operatorname{tr}(CAB)$ we also get

$$f_S(\mathbf{S}) = \frac{
\left |\mathbf{S} \right|^{n-p}
}
{  \left|\mathbf{M}\right|^n\cdot \mathcal{C} \widetilde{\Gamma}_p(n) } \exp \left( -\sum_{i=1}^p G_i^H\mathbf M^{-1} G_i \right )$$

which is quite close to the complex multivariate pdf of G itself. The elements of G conventionally have circular symmetry such that $\mathbb{E}[GG^T] = 0$.

Inverse Complex Wishart The distribution of the inverse complex Wishart distribution of $\mathbf{Y} = \mathbf{S^{-1}}$ according to Goodman, Shaman is

$$f_Y(\mathbf{Y}) = \frac{
\left |\mathbf{Y} \right|^{-(n+p)} e^{-\operatorname{tr}(\mathbf M\mathbf{Y^{-1}}) }
}
{
\left|\mathbf{M}\right|^{-n}\cdot\mathcal{C}\widetilde{\Gamma}_p(n)
}, \;\;\;  n\ge p, \;\;\;  \det \left(\mathbf{Y}\right) > 0$$

where $\mathbf{M} = \mathbf{\Gamma^{-1}}$.

If derived via a matrix inversion mapping, the result depends on the complex Jacobian determinant

$$\mathcal{C}J_Y(Y^{-1}) = \left |  Y \right |^{-2p}$$

Goodman and others discuss such complex Jacobians.

== Eigenvalues ==
The probability distribution of the eigenvalues of the complex Hermitian Wishart distribution are given by, for example, James and Edelman. For a $p \times p$ matrix with $\nu \ge p$ degrees of freedom we have

$$f(\lambda_1\dots\lambda_p)=\tilde {K}_{\nu,p} \exp \left ( - \frac{1}{2} \sum_{i=1}^p \lambda_i \right )
\prod_{i=1}^p \lambda_i^{\nu - p} \prod_{i<j} (\lambda_i - \lambda_j)^2 d\lambda_1 \dots d\lambda_p,
\;\;\; \lambda_i \in \mathbb{R} \ge 0$$

where

$$\tilde {K}_{\nu,p}^{-1} = 2^{p\nu} \prod_{i=1}^p \Gamma (\nu - i+1) \Gamma (p-i+1)$$

Note however that Edelman uses the "mathematical" definition of a complex normal variable $Z = X + iY$ where iid X and Y each have unit variance and the variance of $Z = \mathbf{E} \left(X^2 + Y^2 \right ) = 2$. For the definition more common in engineering circles, with X and Y each having 0.5 variance, the eigenvalues are reduced by a factor of 2.

This spectral density can be integrated to give the probability that all eigenvalues of a Wishart random matrix lie within an interval.

The spectral density can be also integrated to give the marginal distribution of eigenvalues.

There are also approximations for marginal eigenvalue distributions. From Edelman we have that if S is a sample from the complex Wishart distribution with $p = \kappa \nu, \;\; 0 \le \kappa \le 1$ such that $S_{p \times p} \sim \mathcal{CW}\left( 2\mathbf{I}, \frac{p}{\kappa} \right)$ then in the limit $p \rightarrow \infty$ the distribution of eigenvalues converges in probability to the Marchenko–Pastur distribution function

$$p_\lambda(\lambda) =  \frac
{\sqrt { [\lambda/2 - ( \sqrt {\kappa} -1 )^2 ][\sqrt {\kappa} +1 )^2 - \lambda /2 ] }}
{ 4\pi \kappa (\lambda /2)}, \;\;\;  2( \sqrt {\kappa} -1)^2 \le \lambda \le  2(\sqrt {\kappa} +1 )^2,
\;\;\; 0 \le \kappa \le 1$$

This distribution becomes identical to the real Wishart case, by replacing $\lambda$ by $2\lambda$, on account of the doubled sample variance, so in the case $S_{p \times p} \sim \mathcal{CW} \left( \mathbf{I}, \frac{p}{\kappa} \right)$, the pdf reduces to the real Wishart one:

$$p_\lambda(\lambda) =  \frac
{\sqrt {[\lambda - ( \sqrt {\kappa} -1 )^2 ][\sqrt {\kappa} +1 )^2 - \lambda  ] }}
{ 2\pi \kappa \lambda}, \;\;\;   (\sqrt {\kappa} -1)^2 \le \lambda \le  (\sqrt {\kappa} +1 )^2,
\;\;\; 0 \le \kappa \le 1$$

A special case is $\kappa = 1$

$$p_\lambda(\lambda) = \frac {1}{4\pi} \left (\frac {8-\lambda}{\lambda} \right )^{\frac{1}{2}}, \; 0 \le \lambda \le 8$$

or, if a Var(Z) = 1 convention is used then

$$p_\lambda(\lambda) = \frac {1}{2\pi} \left (\frac {4-\lambda}{\lambda} \right )^{\frac{1}{2}}, \; 0 \le \lambda \le 4$$.

The Wigner semicircle distribution arises by making the change of variable $y = \pm\sqrt{\lambda}$ in the latter and selecting the sign of y randomly yielding pdf

$$p_y(y) = \frac {1}{2\pi} \left ( 4-y^2 \right )^{\frac{1}{2}}, \; -2 \le y \le 2$$

In place of the definition of the Wishart sample matrix above, $S_{p \times p} = \sum_{j=1}^\nu G_jG_j^H$, we can define a Gaussian ensemble

$$\mathbf{G}_{i,j} = [G_1 \dots G_\nu ] \in \mathbb{C}^{\,p \times \nu }$$

such that S is the matrix product $S = \mathbf{G}\mathbf{G^H}$. The real non-negative eigenvalues of S are then the modulus-squared singular values of the ensemble $\mathbf{G}$ and the moduli of the latter have a quarter-circle distribution.

In the case $\kappa > 1$ such that $\nu < p$ then $S$ is rank deficient with at least $p - \nu$ null eigenvalues. However the singular values of $\mathbf{G}$ are invariant under transposition so, redefining $\tilde{S} = \mathbf{G^H}\mathbf{G}$, then $\tilde{S}_{\nu \times \nu}$ has a complex Wishart distribution, has full rank almost certainly, and eigenvalue distributions can be obtained from $\tilde{S}$ in lieu, using all the previous equations.

In cases where the columns of $\mathbf{G}$ are not linearly independent and $\tilde{S}_{\nu \times \nu}$ remains singular, a QR decomposition can be used to reduce G to a product like

$$\mathbf{G}  =  Q \begin{bmatrix} \mathbf{R} \\ 0 \end{bmatrix}$$

such that $\mathbf{R}_{q \times q}, \;\; q \le \nu$ is upper triangular with full rank and $\tilde\tilde{S}_{q \times q} = \mathbf{R^H}\mathbf{R}$ has further reduced dimensionality.

The eigenvalues are of practical significance in radio communications theory since they define the Shannon channel capacity of a $\nu \times p$ MIMO wireless channel which, to first approximation, is modeled as a zero-mean complex Gaussian ensemble.
