= Conformable matrix =

Matrices with dimensions suitable for some specified operation

In mathematics, a matrix is conformable if its dimensions are suitable for defining some operation (e.g. addition, multiplication, etc.).

== Examples ==
- If two matrices have the same dimensions (number of rows and number of columns), they are conformable for addition.
- Multiplication of two matrices is defined if and only if the number of columns of the left matrix is the same as the number of rows of the right matrix. That is, if A is an m × n matrix and B is an s × p matrix, then n needs to be equal to s for the matrix product AB to be defined. In this case, we say that A and B are conformable for multiplication (in that sequence).
- Since squaring a matrix involves multiplying it by itself (A^{2} = AA) a matrix must be m × m (that is, it must be a square matrix) to be conformable for squaring. Thus for example only a square matrix can be idempotent.
- Only a square matrix is conformable for matrix inversion. However, the Moore–Penrose pseudoinverse and other generalized inverses do not have this requirement.
- Only a square matrix is conformable for matrix exponentiation.

== See also ==
- Linear algebra
