= Wishart distribution =

Generalization of gamma distribution to multiple dimensions

Wishart
- Notation: X ~ W_{p}(V, n)
- Parameters: n degrees of freedom (real); V > 0 scale matrix (p × p pos. def)
- Support: X (p × p) positive definite matrix
- PDF: $f_{\mathbf X}(\mathbf X) = \frac{|\mathbf{X}|^{(n-p-1)/2} e^{-\operatorname{tr}(\mathbf{V}^{-1}\mathbf{X})/2}}{2^{(np)/2}|{\mathbf V}|^{n/2}\Gamma_p(\frac n 2)}$: Γ_{p} is the multivariate gamma function; tr is the trace function
- Mean: $\operatorname{E}[\mathbf {\mathbf X}]=n{\mathbf V}$
- Mode: (n − p − 1)V for n ≥ p + 1
- Variance: $\operatorname{Var}(\mathbf{X}_{ij}) = n \left (v_{ij}^2+v_{ii}v_{jj} \right )$
- Entropy: see below
- CF: $\Theta \mapsto \left|{\mathbf I} - 2i\,{\mathbf\Theta}{\mathbf V}\right|^{-\frac{n}{2}}$

In statistics, the Wishart distribution is a generalization of the gamma distribution to multiple dimensions. It is named in honor of John Wishart, who first formulated the distribution in 1928. Other names include Wishart ensemble (in random matrix theory, probability distributions over matrices are usually called "ensembles"), or Wishart–Laguerre ensemble (since its eigenvalue distribution involves Laguerre polynomials), or LOE, LUE, LSE (in analogy with GOE, GUE, GSE).

It is a family of probability distributions defined over symmetric, positive-definite random matrices (i.e. matrix-valued random variables). These distributions are of great importance in the estimation of covariance matrices in multivariate statistics. In Bayesian statistics, the Wishart distribution is the conjugate prior of the inverse covariance-matrix of a multivariate-normal random vector.

== Definition ==
Suppose G is a p × n matrix, each column of which is independently drawn from a p-variate normal distribution with zero mean:

$$G = (g_1,\dots,g_n) \sim \mathcal{N}_p(0,V).$$

It means $g_i=(g_{i,1},\dots,g_{i,p})^T\ \overset{iid}\sim\ \mathcal{N}_p(0,V)\ \forall i\in\{1,\dots,n\}$

Then the Wishart distribution is the probability distribution of the p × p random matrix

$$S= G G^T = \sum_{i=1}^n g_{i}g_{i}^T$$

known as the scatter matrix. One indicates that S has that probability distribution by writing

$$S\sim W_p(V,n).$$

The positive integer n is the number of degrees of freedom. Sometimes this is written W(V, p, n). For n ≥ p the matrix S is invertible with probability 1 if V is invertible.

If p = V = 1 then this distribution is a chi-squared distribution with n degrees of freedom.

== Occurrence ==
The Wishart distribution arises as the distribution of the sample covariance matrix for a sample from a multivariate normal distribution. It occurs frequently in likelihood-ratio tests in multivariate statistical analysis. It also arises in the spectral theory of random matrices and in multidimensional Bayesian analysis. It is also encountered in wireless communications, while analyzing the performance of Rayleigh fading MIMO wireless channels.

== Probability density function ==
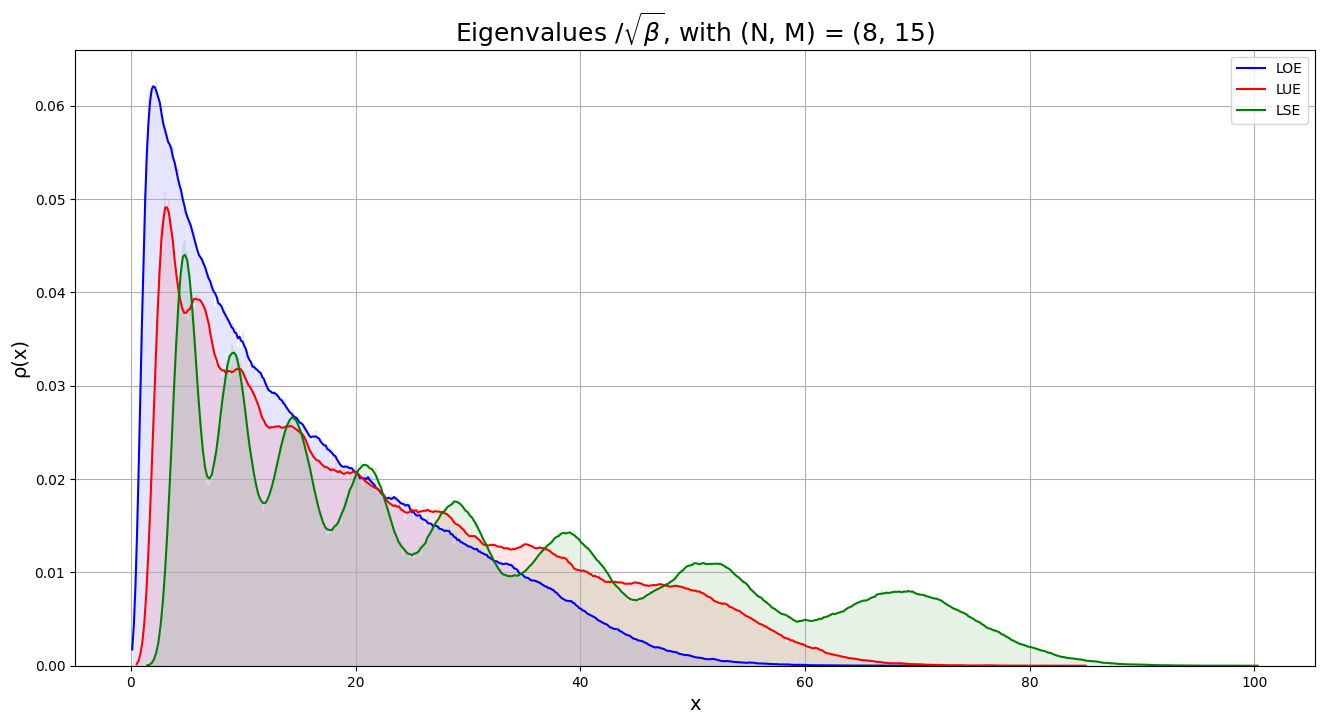
Spectral density of Wishart-Laguerre ensemble with dimensions (8, 15). A reconstruction of Figure 1 of.

The Wishart distribution can be characterized by its probability density function as follows:

Let X be a p × p symmetric matrix of random variables that is positive semi-definite. Let V be a (fixed) symmetric positive definite matrix of size p × p.

Then, if n ≥ p, X has a Wishart distribution with n degrees of freedom if it has the probability density function

$$f_{\mathbf X} (\mathbf X) = \frac{1}{2^{np/2} \left|{\mathbf V}\right|^{n/2} \Gamma_p\left(\frac {n}{2}\right ) }{\left|\mathbf{X}\right|}^{(n-p-1)/2} e^{-\frac{1}{2}\operatorname{tr}({\mathbf V}^{-1}\mathbf{X})}$$

where $\left|{\mathbf X}\right|$ is the determinant of $\mathbf X$ and Γ_{p} is the multivariate gamma function defined as

$$\Gamma_p \left (\frac n 2 \right )= \pi^{p(p-1)/4}\prod_{j=1}^p \Gamma\left( \frac{n}{2} - \frac{j-1}{2} \right ).$$

The density above is not the joint density of all the $p^2$ elements of the random matrix X (such $p^2$-dimensional density does not exist because of the symmetry constrains $X_{ij}=X_{ji}$), it is rather the joint density of $p(p+1)/2$ elements $X_{ij}$ for $i\le j$ (, page 38). Also, the density formula above applies only to positive definite matrices $\mathbf x;$ for other matrices the density is equal to zero.

In fact the above definition can be extended to any real n > p − 1. If n ≤ p − 1, then the Wishart no longer has a density—instead it represents a singular distribution that takes values in a lower-dimension subspace of the space of p × p matrices.

=== Spectral density ===
The joint-eigenvalue density for the eigenvalues $\lambda_1,\dots , \lambda_p\ge 0$ of a random matrix $\mathbf{X}\sim W_p(\mathbf{I},n)$ is,

$$c_{n,p}e^{-\frac{1}{2}\sum_i\lambda_i}\prod \lambda_i^{(n-p-1)/2}\prod_{i<j}|\lambda_i-\lambda_j|$$

where $c_{n,p}$ is a constant. The spectral density can be marginalized to yield the density of a single eigenvalue, by evaluating a Selberg integral.

The spectral density can be integrated to give the probability that all eigenvalues of a Wishart random matrix lie within an interval.

== Use in Bayesian statistics ==
In Bayesian statistics, in the context of the multivariate normal distribution, the Wishart distribution is the conjugate prior to the precision matrix Ω = Σ^{−1}, where Σ is the covariance matrix. The use of Normal-Wishart conjugate priors (for mean and precision) is particularly common for vector autoregression models.

=== Choice of parameters ===
The least informative, proper Wishart prior is obtained by setting n = p.

A common choice for V leverages the fact that the mean of X ~W_{p}(V, n) is nV. Then V is chosen so that nV equals an initial guess for X. For instance, when estimating a precision matrix Σ^{−1} ~ W_{p}(V, n) a reasonable choice for V would be n^{−1}Σ_{0}^{−1}, where Σ_{0} is some prior estimate for the covariance matrix Σ.

== Properties ==
=== Log-expectation ===
The following formula plays a role in variational Bayes derivations for Bayes networks involving the Wishart distribution. From equation (2.63),

$$\operatorname{E}[\, \ln\left|\mathbf{X}\right|\, ] =  \psi_p\left(\frac n 2\right) + p \, \ln(2) + \ln|\mathbf{V}|$$

where $\psi_p$ is the multivariate digamma function (the derivative of the log of the multivariate gamma function).

=== Log-variance ===
The following variance computation could be of help in Bayesian statistics:

$$\operatorname{Var}\left[\, \ln\left|\mathbf{X}\right| \,\right]=\sum_{i=1}^p \psi_1\left(\frac{n+1-i} 2\right)$$

where $\psi_1$ is the trigamma function. This comes up when computing the Fisher information of the Wishart random variable.

=== Entropy ===
The information entropy of the distribution has the following formula:

$$\operatorname{H}\left[\, \mathbf{X} \,\right] = -\ln \left( B(\mathbf{V},n) \right) -\frac{n-p-1}{2} \operatorname{E}\left[\, \ln\left|\mathbf{X}\right|\,\right] + \frac{np}{2}$$

where B(V, n) is the normalizing constant of the distribution:

$$B(\mathbf{V},n) = \frac{1}{\left|\mathbf{V}\right|^{n/2} 2^{np/2}\Gamma_p\left(\frac n 2 \right)}.$$

This can be expanded as follows:

$$\begin{align}
\operatorname{H}\left[\, \mathbf{X}\, \right] & = \frac{n}{2} \ln \left|\mathbf{V}\right| +\frac{n p}{2} \ln 2 + \ln \Gamma_p \left(\frac{n}{2} \right) - \frac{n-p-1}{2} \operatorname{E}\left[\, \ln\left|\mathbf{X}\right|\, \right] + \frac{n p}{2} \\[8pt]
&= \frac{n}{2} \ln\left|\mathbf{V}\right| + \frac{n p}{2} \ln 2 + \ln\Gamma_p\left(\frac{n}{2} \right) - \frac{n-p-1} 2 \left( \psi_p \left(\frac{n}{2}\right) + p\ln 2 + \ln\left|\mathbf{V}\right|\right) + \frac{n p}{2} \\[8pt]
&= \frac{n}{2} \ln\left|\mathbf{V}\right| + \frac{n p}{2} \ln 2 + \ln\Gamma_p\left(\frac n 2\right)
- \frac{n-p-1}{2} \psi_p\left(\frac n 2 \right) - \frac{n-p-1} 2 \left(p\ln 2 +\ln\left|\mathbf{V}\right| \right) + \frac{n p}{2} \\[8pt]
&= \frac{p+1}{2} \ln\left|\mathbf{V}\right| + \frac1 2 p(p+1) \ln 2 + \ln\Gamma_p\left(\frac n 2\right) - \frac{n-p-1}{2} \psi_p\left(\frac n 2 \right)  + \frac{n p}{2}
\end{align}$$

=== Cross-entropy ===
The cross-entropy of two Wishart distributions $p_0$ with parameters $n_0, V_0$ and $p_1$ with parameters $n_1, V_1$ is

$$\begin{align}
H(p_0, p_1) &= \operatorname{E}_{p_0}[\, -\log p_1\, ]\\[8pt]
&= \operatorname{E}_{p_0} \left[\, -\log \frac{\left|\mathbf{X}\right|^{(n_1 - p_1 - 1)/2} e^{-\operatorname{tr}(\mathbf{V}_1^{-1} \mathbf{X})/2}}{2^{n_1 p_1/2} \left|\mathbf{V}_1\right|^{n_1/2} \Gamma_{p_1}\left(\tfrac{n_1}{2}\right)} \right]\\[8pt]
&= \tfrac{n_1 p_1} 2 \log 2 + \tfrac{n_1} 2 \log \left|\mathbf{V}_1\right| + \log \Gamma_{p_1}(\tfrac{n_1} 2) - \tfrac{n_1 - p_1 - 1} 2 \operatorname{E}_{p_0}\left[\, \log\left|\mathbf{X}\right|\, \right] + \tfrac{1}{2}\operatorname{E}_{p_0}\left[\, \operatorname{tr}\left(\,\mathbf{V}_1^{-1}\mathbf{X}\,\right) \,  \right] \\[8pt]
&= \tfrac{n_1 p_1}{2} \log 2 + \tfrac{n_1} 2 \log \left|\mathbf{V}_1\right| + \log \Gamma_{p_1}(\tfrac{n_1}{2}) - \tfrac{n_1 - p_1 - 1}{2} \left( \psi_{p_0}(\tfrac{n_0} 2) + p_0 \log 2 + \log \left|\mathbf{V}_0\right|\right)+ \tfrac{1}{2} \operatorname{tr}\left(\, \mathbf{V}_1^{-1} n_0 \mathbf{V}_0\, \right) \\[8pt]
&=-\tfrac{n_1}{2} \log \left|\, \mathbf{V}_1^{-1} \mathbf{V}_0\, \right| +  \tfrac{p_1+1} 2 \log \left|\mathbf{V}_0\right| + \tfrac{n_0} 2 \operatorname{tr}\left(\, \mathbf{V}_1^{-1} \mathbf{V}_0\right)+ \log \Gamma_{p_1}\left(\tfrac{n_1}{2}\right) - \tfrac{n_1 - p_1 - 1}{2} \psi_{p_0}(\tfrac{n_0}{2})  +  \tfrac{n_1(p_1 - p_0)+p_0(p_1+1)}{2} \log 2
\end{align}$$

Note that when $p_0=p_1$ and $n_0=n_1$ we recover the entropy.

=== KL-divergence ===
The Kullback–Leibler divergence of $p_1$ from $p_0$ is

$$\begin{align}
D_{KL}(p_0 \| p_1) & = H(p_0, p_1) - H(p_0) \\[6pt]
& =-\frac{n_1} 2 \log |\mathbf{V}_1^{-1} \mathbf{V}_0|  + \frac{n_0}{2}(\operatorname{tr}(\mathbf{V}_1^{-1} \mathbf{V}_0) - p)+ \log \frac{\Gamma_p\left(\frac{n_1} 2 \right)}{\Gamma_p\left(\frac{n_0} 2 \right)} + \tfrac{n_0 - n_1 } 2 \psi_p\left(\frac{n_0} 2\right)
\end{align}$$

=== Characteristic function ===
The characteristic function of the Wishart distribution is

$$\Theta \mapsto \operatorname{E}\left[ \, \exp\left( \,i \operatorname{tr}\left(\,\mathbf{X}{\mathbf\Theta}\,\right)\,\right)\, \right] = \left|\, 1 - 2i\, {\mathbf\Theta}\,{\mathbf V}\, \right|^{-n/2}$$

where E[⋅] denotes expectation. (Here Θ is any matrix with the same dimensions as V, 1 indicates the identity matrix, and i is a square root of −1). Properly interpreting this formula requires a little care, because noninteger complex powers are multivalued; when n is noninteger, the correct branch must be determined via analytic continuation.

== Theorem ==
If a p × p random matrix X has a Wishart distribution with m degrees of freedom and variance matrix V — write $\mathbf{X}\sim\mathcal{W}_p({\mathbf V},m)$ — and C is a q × p matrix of rank q, then

$$\mathbf{C}\mathbf{X}{\mathbf C}^T \sim \mathcal{W}_q\left({\mathbf C}{\mathbf V}{\mathbf C}^T,m\right).$$

=== Corollary 1 ===
If z is a nonzero p × 1 constant vector, then:

$$\sigma_z^{-2} \, {\mathbf z}^T\mathbf{X}{\mathbf z} \sim \chi_m^2.$$

In this case, $\chi_m^2$ is the chi-squared distribution and $\sigma_z^2={\mathbf z}^T{\mathbf V}{\mathbf z}$ (note that $\sigma_z^2$ is a constant; it is positive because V is positive definite).

=== Corollary 2 ===
Consider the case where z^{T} = (0, ..., 0, 1, 0, ..., 0) (that is, the j-th element is one and all others zero). Then corollary 1 above shows that

$$\sigma_{jj}^{-1} \, w_{jj}\sim \chi^2_m$$

gives the marginal distribution of each of the elements on the matrix's diagonal.

George Seber points out that the Wishart distribution is not called the “multivariate chi-squared distribution” because the marginal distribution of the off-diagonal elements is not chi-squared. Seber prefers to reserve the term multivariate for the case when all univariate marginals belong to the same family.

== Estimator of the multivariate normal distribution ==
The Wishart distribution is the sampling distribution of the maximum-likelihood estimator (MLE) of the covariance matrix of a multivariate normal distribution. A derivation of the MLE uses the spectral theorem.

== Bartlett decomposition ==
The Bartlett decomposition of a matrix X from a p-variate Wishart distribution with scale matrix V and n degrees of freedom is the factorization:

$$\mathbf{X} = {\textbf L}{\textbf A}{\textbf A}^T{\textbf L}^T,$$

where L is the Cholesky factor of V, and:

$$\mathbf A = \begin{pmatrix}
c_1 & 0 & 0 & \cdots & 0\\
n_{21} & c_2 &0 & \cdots& 0 \\
n_{31} & n_{32} & c_3 & \cdots & 0\\
\vdots & \vdots & \vdots &\ddots & \vdots \\
n_{p1} & n_{p2} & n_{p3} &\cdots & c_p
\end{pmatrix}$$

where $c_i^2 \sim \chi^2_{n-i+1}$ and n_{ij} ~ N(0, 1) independently. This provides a useful method for obtaining random samples from a Wishart distribution.

== Marginal distribution of matrix elements ==
Let V be a 2 × 2 variance matrix characterized by correlation coefficient −1 < ρ < 1 and L its lower Cholesky factor:

$$\mathbf{V} = \begin{pmatrix}
\sigma_1^2 & \rho \sigma_1 \sigma_2 \\
\rho \sigma_1 \sigma_2 & \sigma_2^2
\end{pmatrix},
\qquad
\mathbf{L} = \begin{pmatrix}
\sigma_1 & 0 \\
\rho \sigma_2 & \sqrt{1-\rho^2} \sigma_2
\end{pmatrix}$$

Multiplying through the Bartlett decomposition above, we find that a random sample from the 2 × 2 Wishart distribution is

$$\mathbf{X} = \begin{pmatrix}
\sigma_1^2 c_1^2 & \sigma_1 \sigma_2 \left (\rho c_1^2 + \sqrt{1-\rho^2} c_1 n_{21} \right ) \\
\sigma_1 \sigma_2 \left (\rho c_1^2 + \sqrt{1-\rho^2} c_1 n_{21} \right ) & \sigma_2^2 \left(\left (1-\rho^2 \right ) c_2^2 + \left (\sqrt{1-\rho^2} n_{21} + \rho c_1 \right )^2 \right)
\end{pmatrix}$$

The diagonal elements, most evidently in the first element, follow the χ^{2} distribution with n degrees of freedom (scaled by σ^{2}) as expected. The off-diagonal element is less familiar but can be identified as a normal variance-mean mixture where the mixing density is a χ^{2} distribution. The corresponding marginal probability density for the off-diagonal element is therefore the variance-gamma distribution

$$f(x_{12}) =  \frac{\left | x_{12} \right |^{\frac{n-1}{2}}}{\Gamma\left(\frac{n}{2}\right) \sqrt{2^{n-1} \pi \left (1-\rho^2 \right ) \left (\sigma_1 \sigma_2 \right )^{n+1}}} \cdot K_{\frac{n-1}{2}} \left(\frac{\left |x_{12} \right |}{\sigma_1 \sigma_2 \left (1-\rho^2 \right )}\right) \exp{\left(\frac{\rho x_{12}}{\sigma_1 \sigma_2 (1-\rho^2)}\right)}$$

where K_{ν}(z) is the modified Bessel function of the second kind. Similar results may be found for higher dimensions. In general, if $X$ follows a Wishart distribution with parameters, $\Sigma, n$, then for $i \neq j$, the off-diagonal elements

$X_{ij} \sim \text{VG}(n, \Sigma_{ij}, (\Sigma_{ii} \Sigma_{jj} - \Sigma_{ij}^2)^{1/2}, 0)$.

It is also possible to write down the moment-generating function even in the noncentral case (essentially the nth power of Craig (1936) equation 10) although the probability density becomes an infinite sum of Bessel functions.

== The range of the shape parameter ==
It can be shown that the Wishart distribution can be defined if and only if the shape parameter n belongs to the set

$$\Lambda_p:=\{0,\ldots,p-1\}\cup \left(p-1,\infty\right).$$

This set is named after Simon Gindikin, who introduced it in the 1970s in the context of gamma distributions on homogeneous cones. However, for the new parameters in the discrete spectrum of the Gindikin ensemble, namely,

$$\Lambda_p^*:=\{0, \ldots, p-1\},$$

the corresponding Wishart distribution has no Lebesgue density.

== Wishart–Laguerre ensembles and β-extensions ==
In random matrix theory, the Wishart family is often studied through its Laguerre ensembles. For the real case (orthogonal symmetry, β=1), the joint density of the eigenvalues $\lambda_1,\dots,\lambda_p \ge 0$ of $\mathbf{X}\sim W_p(\mathbf{I},n)$ is

$$c_{n,p}\,\exp\!\Big(-\tfrac{1}{2}\sum_{i=1}^p \lambda_i\Big)\;
\prod_{i=1}^p \lambda_i^{\tfrac{n-p-1}{2}}\;
\prod_{1\le i<j\le p}\!|\lambda_i-\lambda_j|,$$

which is the Laguerre orthogonal ensemble (LOE). The complex and quaternion analogues are the Laguerre unitary (LUE, $\beta=2$) and Laguerre symplectic (LSE, $\beta=4$) ensembles, respectively.

=== β-Laguerre ensemble (general $\beta>0$) ===
A further generalization, the β-Laguerre ensemble, allows the Dyson index $\beta>0$ to vary continuously. Its joint eigenvalue density has the Coulomb gas form

$$p(\lambda_1,\ldots,\lambda_p)\;\propto\;
\Big(\prod_{i=1}^p \lambda_i^{\alpha}\,e^{-\tfrac{\beta}{2}\lambda_i}\Big)\;
\Big(\prod_{i<j}|\lambda_i-\lambda_j|^{\beta}\Big), \qquad \alpha>-1,$$

which reduces to LOE/LUE/LSE for $\beta=1,2,4$. For the classical Gaussian Wishart case (scale $\mathbf{I}$), one has the identification

$$\alpha \;=\; \tfrac{\beta}{2}\,(n-p+1)\;-\;1.$$

A concrete probabilistic construction for any $\beta>0$ is provided by the Dumitriu–Edelman bidiagonal model. One samples a random bidiagonal matrix $\mathbf{B}$ with independent chi variables and sets $\mathbf{L}=\mathbf{B}\mathbf{B}^{T}$; the eigenvalues of $\mathbf{L}$ follow the β-Laguerre law with parameter $\alpha$.

Sampling

- Classical $\beta=1,2,4$. Bartlett's decomposition gives $\mathbf{X} = \mathbf{L}\mathbf{A}\mathbf{A}^{T}\mathbf{L}^{T}$ with $\mathbf{A}$ lower-triangular having chi/normal entries, yielding LOE/LUE/LSE exactly.
- General $\beta>0$. In the Dumitriu–Edelman model, for matrix size $p$ and parameter $\alpha>-1$, one samples independently

$$B_{ii}\sim \tfrac{1}{\sqrt{\beta}}\;\chi_{\beta(\alpha+p-i+1)},\qquad
B_{i,i-1}\sim \tfrac{1}{\sqrt{\beta}}\;\chi_{\beta(p-i+1)} \quad (i=2,\dots,p),$$

and sets $\mathbf{L}=\mathbf{B}\mathbf{B}^{T}$. Then the eigenvalues of $\mathbf{L}$ have the β-Laguerre joint density above.

Rectangular data matrices

If one wishes to realize these spectra as the singular values of a rectangular $M\times N$ matrix (with $M\ge N=p$), draw independent Haar-distributed $\mathbf{U}\in O(M)$ (or $U(M)$) and $\mathbf{V}\in O(N)$, and set

$$X \;=\; U\begin{bmatrix}\operatorname{diag}(\sqrt{\lambda_1},\dots,\sqrt{\lambda_p})\\ 0\end{bmatrix} V^{*},$$

so that $X^{*}X$ has eigenvalues $\{\lambda_i\}$. For i.i.d. Gaussian entries (true Wishart), $\beta$ is fixed by the field (real, complex, quaternion) and $\alpha$ reduces to $\tfrac{\beta}{2}(n-p+1)-1$.

=== Hard-edge behavior and universality ===
At the “hard edge” (near $\lambda=0$), β-Laguerre ensembles exhibit Bessel-kernel correlations and level repulsion of order $\beta$. In particular, with $p\to\infty$ and fixed $\alpha$, the distribution of the smallest eigenvalue converges to a universal hard-edge (Bessel) law that depends only on $\alpha$ and $\beta$.

=== Macroscopic limit (Marchenko–Pastur law) ===
Under proportional growth $p/n\to\gamma\in(0,\infty)$, the empirical spectral distribution of $n^{-1}\mathbf{G}\mathbf{G}^{T}$ (with i.i.d. entries of variance $\sigma^2$) converges almost surely to the Marchenko–Pastur law, supported on $\sigma^2(1\pm\sqrt{\gamma})^2$. When $\gamma=1$, the density diverges as $x^{-1/2}$ at the origin (a hard-edge singularity).

== Relationships to other distributions ==
- The Wishart distribution is related to the inverse-Wishart distribution, denoted by $W_p^{-1}$, as follows: If X ~ W_{p}(V, n) and if we do the change of variables C = X^{−1}, then $\mathbf{C}\sim W_p^{-1}(\mathbf{V}^{-1},n)$. This relationship may be derived by noting that the absolute value of the Jacobian determinant of this change of variables is |C|^{p+1}, see for example equation (15.15) in.
- In Bayesian statistics, the Wishart distribution is a conjugate prior for the precision parameter of the multivariate normal distribution, when the mean parameter is known.
- A generalization is the multivariate gamma distribution.
- A different type of generalization is the normal-Wishart distribution, essentially the product of a multivariate normal distribution with a Wishart distribution.

== See also ==
- Chi-squared distribution
- Complex Wishart distribution
- F-distribution
- Gamma distribution
- Hotelling's T-squared distribution
- Inverse-Wishart distribution
- Multivariate gamma distribution
- Student's t-distribution
- Wilks' lambda distribution
