= Matrix normal distribution =

Probability distribution

Matrix normal
- Notation: $\mathcal{MN}_{n,p}(\mathbf{M}, \mathbf{U}, \mathbf{V})$
- Parameters: $\mathbf{M}$ location (real $n\times p$ matrix) $\mathbf{U}$ scale (positive-definite real $n\times n$ matrix) $\mathbf{V}$ scale (positive-definite real $p\times p$ matrix)
- Support: $\mathbf{X} \in \mathbb{R}^{n \times p}$
- PDF: $\frac{\exp\left( -\frac{1}{2} \, \mathrm{tr}\left[ \mathbf{V}^{-1} (\mathbf{X} - \mathbf{M})^{T} \mathbf{U}^{-1} (\mathbf{X} - \mathbf{M}) \right] \right)}{(2\pi)^{np/2} |\mathbf{V}|^{n/2} |\mathbf{U}|^{p/2}}$
- Mean: $\mathbf{M}$
- Variance: $\mathbf{U}$ (among-row) and $\mathbf{V}$ (among-column)

In statistics, the matrix normal distribution or matrix Gaussian distribution is a probability distribution that is a generalization of the multivariate normal distribution to matrix-valued random variables.

== Definition ==
The probability density function for the random matrix X (n × p) that follows the matrix normal distribution $\mathcal{MN}_{n,p}(\mathbf{M}, \mathbf{U}, \mathbf{V})$ has the form:

$$p(\mathbf{X}\mid\mathbf{M}, \mathbf{U}, \mathbf{V}) = \frac{\exp\left( -\frac{1}{2} \, \mathrm{tr}\left[ \mathbf{V}^{-1} (\mathbf{X} - \mathbf{M})^{T} \mathbf{U}^{-1} (\mathbf{X} - \mathbf{M}) \right] \right)}{(2\pi)^{np/2} |\mathbf{V}|^{n/2} |\mathbf{U}|^{p/2}}$$

where $\mathrm{tr}$ denotes trace and M is n × p, U is n × n and V is p × p, and the density is understood as the probability density function with respect to the standard Lebesgue measure in $\mathbb{R}^{n\times p}$, i.e.: the measure corresponding to integration with respect to $dx_{11} dx_{21}\dots dx_{n1} dx_{12}\dots dx_{n2}\dots dx_{np}$.

The matrix normal is related to the multivariate normal distribution in the following way:

$$\mathbf{X} \sim \mathcal{MN}_{n\times p}(\mathbf{M}, \mathbf{U}, \mathbf{V}),$$

if and only if

$$\mathrm{vec}(\mathbf{X}) \sim \mathcal{N}_{np}(\mathrm{vec}(\mathbf{M}), \mathbf{V} \otimes \mathbf{U})$$

where $\otimes$ denotes the Kronecker product and $\mathrm{vec}(\mathbf{M})$ denotes the vectorization of $\mathbf{M}$.

=== Proof ===
The equivalence between the above matrix normal and multivariate normal density functions can be shown using several properties of the trace and Kronecker product, as follows. We start with the argument of the exponent of the matrix normal PDF:

$$\begin{align}
&\;\;\;\;-\frac12\text{tr}\left[ \mathbf{V}^{-1} (\mathbf{X} - \mathbf{M})^{T} \mathbf{U}^{-1} (\mathbf{X} - \mathbf{M}) \right]\\
&= -\frac12\text{vec}\left(\mathbf{X} - \mathbf{M}\right)^T
\text{vec}\left(\mathbf{U}^{-1} (\mathbf{X} - \mathbf{M}) \mathbf{V}^{-1}\right) \\
&= -\frac12\text{vec}\left(\mathbf{X} - \mathbf{M}\right)^T
\left(\mathbf{V}^{-1}\otimes\mathbf{U}^{-1}\right)\text{vec}\left(\mathbf{X} - \mathbf{M}\right) \\
&= -\frac12\left[\text{vec}(\mathbf{X}) - \text{vec}(\mathbf{M})\right]^T
\left(\mathbf{V}\otimes\mathbf{U}\right)^{-1}\left[\text{vec}(\mathbf{X}) - \text{vec}(\mathbf{M})\right]
\end{align}$$

which is the argument of the exponent of the multivariate normal PDF with respect to Lebesgue measure in $\mathbb{R}^{n p}$. The proof is completed by using the determinant property: $|\mathbf{V}\otimes \mathbf{U}| = |\mathbf{V}|^n |\mathbf{U}|^p.$

== Properties ==
If $\mathbf{X} \sim \mathcal{MN}_{n\times p}(\mathbf{M}, \mathbf{U}, \mathbf{V})$, then we have the following properties:

=== Expected values ===
The mean, or expected value is:

$$E[\mathbf{X}] = \mathbf{M}$$

and we have the following second-order expectations:

$$E[(\mathbf{X} - \mathbf{M})(\mathbf{X} - \mathbf{M})^{T}]
= \mathbf{U}\operatorname{tr}(\mathbf{V})$$

$$E[(\mathbf{X} - \mathbf{M})^{T} (\mathbf{X} - \mathbf{M})]
= \mathbf{V}\operatorname{tr}(\mathbf{U})$$

where $\operatorname{tr}$ denotes trace.

More generally, for appropriately dimensioned matrices A,B,C:

$$\begin{align}
E[\mathbf{X}\mathbf{A}\mathbf{X}^{T}]
&= \mathbf{U}\operatorname{tr}(\mathbf{A}^T\mathbf{V}) + \mathbf{MAM}^T\\
E[\mathbf{X}^T\mathbf{B}\mathbf{X}]
&= \mathbf{V}\operatorname{tr}(\mathbf{U}\mathbf{B}^T) + \mathbf{M}^T\mathbf{BM}\\
E[\mathbf{X}\mathbf{C}\mathbf{X}]
&= \mathbf{V}\mathbf{C}^T\mathbf{U} + \mathbf{MCM}
\end{align}$$

=== Transformation ===
Transpose transform:

$$\mathbf{X}^T \sim \mathcal{MN}_{p\times n}(\mathbf{M}^T, \mathbf{V}, \mathbf{U})$$

Linear transform: let D (r-by-n), be of full rank r ≤ n and C (p-by-s), be of full rank s ≤ p, then:

$$\mathbf{DXC}\sim \mathcal{MN}_{r\times s}(\mathbf{DMC}, \mathbf{DUD}^T, \mathbf{C}^T\mathbf{VC})$$

=== Composition ===
The product of two matrix normal densities

$$\mathcal{MN}(\mathbf{M_1}, \mathbf{U_1}, \mathbf{V_1})\cdot \mathcal{MN}(\mathbf{M_2}, \mathbf{U_2}, \mathbf{V_2}) \propto \mathcal{N}(\mu_c, \Sigma_c)$$

is proportional to a normal density with parameters:

$$\Sigma_c = (V_1^{-1} \otimes U_1^{-1} + V_2^{-1} \otimes U_2^{-1})^{-1},$$
$$\mu_c = \Sigma_c \big((V_1^{-1} \otimes U_1^{-1}) \operatorname{vec}(M_1) + (V_2^{-1} \otimes U_2^{-1})\operatorname{vec}(M_2)\big).$$

Note: this is distinct from the product of normal variables, which is not generally normal.

== Example ==
Let's imagine a sample of n independent p-dimensional random variables identically distributed according to a multivariate normal distribution:

$$\mathbf{Y}_i \sim \mathcal{N}_p({\boldsymbol \mu}, {\boldsymbol \Sigma}) \text{ with } i \in \{1,\ldots,n\}$$.

When defining the n × p matrix $\mathbf{X}$ for which the ith row is $\mathbf{Y}_i$, we obtain:

$$\mathbf{X} \sim \mathcal{MN}_{n \times p}(\mathbf{M}, \mathbf{U}, \mathbf{V})$$

where each row of $\mathbf{M}$ is equal to ${\boldsymbol \mu}$, that is $\mathbf{M}=\mathbf{1}_n \times {\boldsymbol \mu}^T$, $\mathbf{U}$ is the n × n identity matrix, that is the rows are independent, and $\mathbf{V} = {\boldsymbol \Sigma}$.

== Maximum likelihood parameter estimation ==
Given k matrices, each of size n × p, denoted $\mathbf{X}_1, \mathbf{X}_2, \ldots, \mathbf{X}_k$, which we assume have been sampled i.i.d. from a matrix normal distribution, the maximum likelihood estimate of the parameters can be obtained by maximizing:

$$\prod_{i=1}^k \mathcal{MN}_{n\times p}(\mathbf{X}_i\mid\mathbf{M},\mathbf{U},\mathbf{V}).$$

The solution for the mean has a closed form, namely

$$\mathbf{M} = \frac{1}{k} \sum_{i=1}^k\mathbf{X}_i$$

but the covariance parameters do not. However, these parameters can be iteratively maximized by zero-ing their gradients at:

$$\mathbf{U} = \frac{1}{kp} \sum_{i=1}^k(\mathbf{X}_i-\mathbf{M})\mathbf{V}^{-1}(\mathbf{X}_i-\mathbf{M})^T$$

and

$$\mathbf{V} = \frac{1}{kn} \sum_{i=1}^k(\mathbf{X}_i-\mathbf{M})^T\mathbf{U}^{-1}(\mathbf{X}_i-\mathbf{M}),$$

See for example and references therein. The covariance parameters are non-identifiable in the sense that for any scale factor, s>0, we have:

$$\mathcal{MN}_{n\times p}(\mathbf{X}\mid\mathbf{M},\mathbf{U},\mathbf{V}) = \mathcal{MN}_{n\times p}(\mathbf{X}\mid\mathbf{M},s\mathbf{U},\tfrac{1}{s}\mathbf{V}) .$$

== Drawing values from the distribution ==
Sampling from the matrix normal distribution is a special case of the sampling procedure for the multivariate normal distribution. Let $\mathbf{X}$ be an n by p matrix of np independent samples from the standard normal distribution, so that

$$\mathbf{X}\sim\mathcal{MN}_{n\times p}(\mathbf{0},\mathbf{I},\mathbf{I}).$$

Then let

$$\mathbf{Y}=\mathbf{M}+\mathbf{A}\mathbf{X}\mathbf{B},$$

so that

$$\mathbf{Y}\sim\mathcal{MN}_{n\times p}(\mathbf{M},\mathbf{AA}^T,\mathbf{B}^T\mathbf{B}),$$

where A and B can be chosen by Cholesky decomposition or a similar matrix square root operation.

== Relation to other distributions ==
Dawid (1981) provides a discussion of the relation of the matrix-valued normal distribution to other distributions, including the Wishart distribution, inverse-Wishart distribution and matrix t-distribution, but uses different notation from that employed here.

== See also ==
- Multivariate normal distribution
