= Patricia Reynaud-Bouret =

French statistician

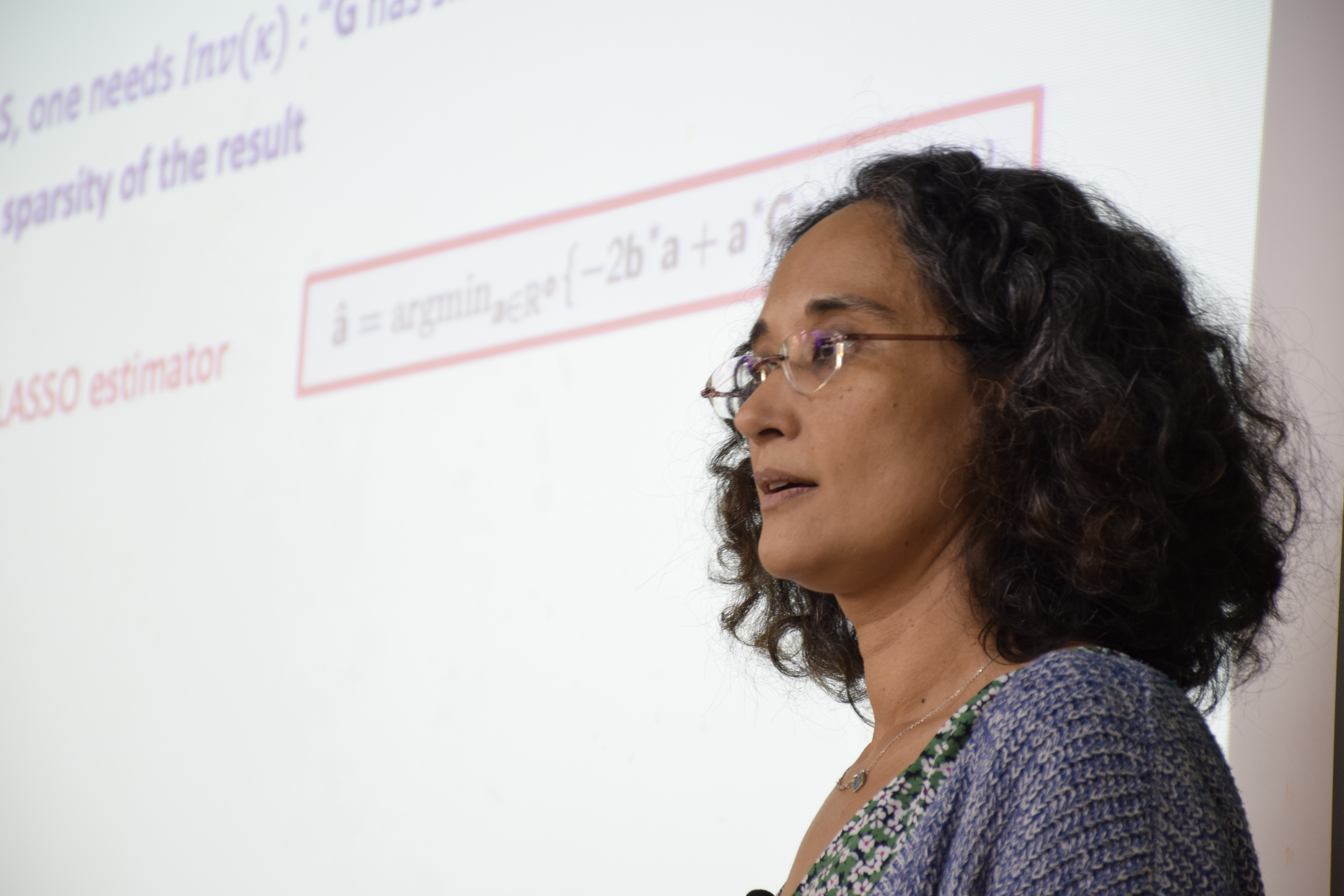
Patricia Reynaud-Bouret, in 2023

Patricia Reynaud-Bouret (born 1978) is a French statistician who has studied Hawkes processes, density estimation, and concentration inequalities, and applied them in neuroscience, neural connectivity reconstruction, and genomics. She is a director of research for the French National Centre for Scientific Research (CNRS), affiliated with the J. A. Dieudonné Laboratory of Côte d'Azur University (LJAD), founder and former director of the university's NeuroMod Institute for Modeling in Neuroscience and Cognition, and a chair holder in the university's Interdisciplinary Institute for Artificial Intelligence (3iA).

== Education and career ==
After studying at the École normale supérieure (Paris), Reynaud-Bouret earned a master's degree in 1999 through Paris-Sud University. She continued there for a doctorate in 2002, with the dissertation Estimation adaptative de l'intensité de certains processus ponctuels par sélection de modèle supervised by Pascal Massart.

After postdoctoral research with Christian Houdré at Georgia Tech, she joined CNRS in 2003 and moved to the Dieudonné Laboratory in 2008. She earned a habilitation in 2011 and was promoted to director of research in 2014. She was given a chair in 3iA in 2019, and at the same time became founding director of the NeuroMod Institute.

== Recognition ==
Reynaud-Bouret was the 2020 winner of the Pierre Faurre prize of the French Academy of Sciences. She was given the CNRS Silver Medal in 2021.
