= Kazuoki Azuma =

Japanese mathematician

Kazuoki Azuma (吾妻 一興, Azuma Kazuoki) (born 1939) is a Japanese mathematician. Azuma's inequality in probability theory is named after him.

== Publications ==
- Azuma, Kazuoki (1967). "Weighted sums of certain dependent random variables" (PDF). Tohoku Mathematical Journal. 19 (3): 357–367. doi:10.2748/tmj/1178243286. ISSN 0040-8735.
