= Pascal Massart =

French statistician

- Born: 23 January 1958 (age 68)
- Citizenship: France
- Education: Paris-Sud University (PhD)
- Scientific career
- Thesis: Quelques problèmes de vitesse de convergence pour des processus empiriques (1987)
- Doctoral advisor: Jean Bretagnolle

Pascal Massart (born 23 January 1958) is a French statistician.

His work focuses on probability and statistics, notably the Dvoretzky–Kiefer–Wolfowitz inequality, the Bousquet inequality, the concentration inequality, and the Efron-Stein inequality. With Lucien Birgé he worked on model selection.

He received his Ph.D. in statistics from Paris-Sud University under Jean Bretagnolle. He has worked at the University of Paris-Sud and at the University of Lyon.

== Honors and awards ==
He was awarded the COPSS Presidents' Award in 1998. He was awarded the Prix Pierre-Simon de Laplace from the French Statistical Society in 2007 alongside Paul Deheuvels. He was a lecturer at the European Congress of Mathematics in 2004 in Stockholm.

== Books ==
- Concentration Inequalities: A Nonasymptotic Theory of Independence (2013)
- Concentration Inequalities and Model Selection (2003)
