= Hoeffding's inequality =

Probabilistic inequality applying on sum of bounded random variables

In probability theory, Hoeffding's inequality provides an upper bound on the probability that the sum of bounded independent random variables deviates from its expected value by more than a certain amount. Hoeffding's inequality was proven by Wassily Hoeffding in 1963.

Hoeffding's inequality is a special case of the Azuma–Hoeffding inequality and McDiarmid's inequality. It is similar to the Chernoff bound, but tends to be less sharp, in particular when the variance of the random variables is small. It is similar to, but incomparable with, one of Bernstein's inequalities.

== Statement ==
Let X_{1}, ..., X_{n} be independent random variables such that $a_i \leq X_i \leq b_i$ almost surely. Consider the sum of these random variables,

$$S_n = X_1 + \cdots + X_n.$$

Then Hoeffding's theorem states that, for all t > 0,

$$\begin{align}
\operatorname{P} \left(S_n - \mathrm{E}\left [S_n \right] \geq t \right) &\leq \exp \left(-\frac{2t^2}{\sum_{i=1}^n (b_i - a_i)^2} \right) \\
\operatorname{P} \left(\left |S_n - \mathrm{E}\left [S_n \right] \right | \geq t \right) &\leq 2\exp \left(-\frac{2t^2}{\sum_{i=1}^n(b_i - a_i)^2} \right)
\end{align}$$

Here E[S_{n}] is the expected value of S_{n}.

Note that the inequalities also hold when the X_{i} have been obtained using sampling without replacement; in this case the random variables are not independent anymore. A proof of this statement can be found in Hoeffding's paper. For slightly better bounds in the case of sampling without replacement, see for instance the paper by Serfling (1974).

=== Generalization ===
Let $Y_1, \dots, Y_n$ be independent observations such that $\operatorname{E} (Y_i) = 0$ and $a_i \le Y_i \le b_i$. Let $\epsilon > 0$. Then, for any $t > 0$,
$$P \left( \sum_{i=1}^n Y_i \ge \epsilon \right) \le \exp \left( - t \epsilon + \sum_{i=1}^n t^2 (b_i - a_i)^2 / 8 \right)$$

=== Special Case: Bernoulli RVs ===
Suppose $a_i = 0$ and $b_i = 1$ for all i. This can occur when X_{i} are independent Bernoulli random variables, though they need not be identically distributed. Then we get the inequality

$$\begin{align}
\operatorname{P}\left(S_n - \mathrm{E}\left[S_n\right] \geq t\right) &\leq \exp(-2t^2/n)\\
\operatorname{P}\left(\left|S_n - \mathrm{E}\left[S_n\right]\right| \geq t\right) &\leq 2\exp(-2t^2/n)
\end{align}$$

or equivalently,

$$\begin{align}
\operatorname{P}\left((S_n - \mathrm{E}\left[S_n\right])/n \geq t\right) &\leq \exp(-2 n t^2 )\\
\operatorname{P}\left(\left|(S_n - \mathrm{E}\left[S_n\right])/n\right| \geq t\right) &\leq 2\exp(-2 n t^2)
\end{align}$$

for all $t \geq 0$. This is a version of the additive Chernoff bound which is more general, since it allows for random variables that take values between zero and one, but also weaker, since the Chernoff bound gives a better tail bound when the random variables have small variance.

== General case of bounded from above random variables ==
Hoeffding's inequality can be extended to the case of bounded from above random variables.

Let X_{1}, ..., X_{n} be independent random variables such that $\mathrm{E}X_{i}=0$ and $X_i \leq b_i$ almost surely. Denote by

$$\begin{align}
C_i^2=  \left\{ \begin{array}{ll}
\mathrm{E}X_{i}^2  , &  \mathrm{if}\ \mathrm{E}X_{i}^2  \geq b^2_{i}  , \\
\displaystyle\frac{1}{4}\left( b_{i}  + \frac{\mathrm{E}X_{i}^2 }{ b_{i} }\right)^2, & \textrm{otherwise}.
\end{array} \right.
\end{align}$$

Hoeffding's inequality for bounded from above random variables states that for all $t \geq 0$,

$$\mathrm{P}\left( \left| \sum_{i=1}^n X_i \right| \geq t \right) \leq 2\exp\left( -\frac{ t^2}{2\sum_{i=1}^nC_i^2  } \right).$$

In particular, if $\mathrm{E}X_{i}^2 \geq b^2_{i}$ for all $i$, then for all $t \geq 0$,

$$\mathrm{P}\left( \left| \sum_{i=1}^n X_i \right| \geq t \right) \leq 2\exp\left( -\frac{ t^2}{2\sum_{i=1}^n \mathrm{E}X_{i}^2   } \right).$$

== General case of sub-Gaussian random variables ==
The proof of Hoeffding's inequality can be generalized to any sub-Gaussian distribution. Recall that a random variable X is called sub-Gaussian, if

$$\mathrm{P}(|X|\geq t)\leq 2e^{-ct^2},$$

for some $c>0$. For any bounded variable X, $\mathrm{P}(|X|\geq t) = 0 \leq 2e^{-ct^2}$ for $t > T$ for some sufficiently large T. Then $2e^{-cT^2} \leq 2e^{-ct^2}$ for all $t \leq T$ so taking $c = \log(2) / T^2$ yields

$$\mathrm{P}(|X|\geq t)\leq 1 \leq 2e^{-cT^2} \leq 2e^{-ct^2},$$

for $t \leq T$. So every bounded variable is sub-Gaussian.

For a random variable X, the following norm is finite if and only if X is sub-Gaussian:

$$\Vert X \Vert_{\psi_2} := \inf\left\{c\geq 0: \mathrm{E} \left( e^{X^2/c^2} \right) \leq 2\right\}.$$

Then let X_{1}, ..., X_{n} be independent sub-Gaussian random variables, the general version of the Hoeffding's inequality states that:

$$\mathrm{P}\left( \left| \sum_{i=1}^n (X_i - E[X_i]) \right| \geq t \right) \leq 2\exp\left( -\frac{ct^2}{\sum_{i=1}^n \Vert X_i \Vert^2_{\psi_2}} \right),$$

where c > 0 is an absolute constant.

Equivalently, we can define sub-Gaussian distributions by variance proxy, defined as follows. If there exists some $s^2$ such that $\operatorname{E} [e^{(X-\operatorname{E}[X])t}] \leq e^{\frac{s^2t^2}{2}}$ for all $t$, then $s^2$ is called a variance proxy, and the smallest such $s^2$ is called the optimal variance proxy, and denoted by $\Vert X\Vert_{\mathrm{vp}}^2$. In this form, Hoeffding's inequality states
$$\mathrm{P}\left( \left| \sum_{i=1}^n (X_i - E[X_i]) \right| \geq t \right)
\leq 2\exp\left( -\frac{t^2}{2\sum_{i=1}^n \| X_i \|^2_{\mathrm{vp}}} \right),$$

== Proof ==
We quote:

Hoeffding's lemma—Suppose X is a real random variable such that $X\in\left[a,b\right]$ almost surely. Then

$\mathrm{E} \left [e^{s\left (X-\mathrm{E}\left [X \right ]\right )} \right ]\leq \exp\left(\tfrac{1}{8} s^2 (b-a)^2\right).$

The proof of Hoeffding's inequality then follows similarly to concentration inequalities like Chernoff bounds.

Proof

As in the theorem statement, suppose X_{1}, ..., X_{n} are n independent random variables such that $X_i\in [a_i,b_i]$ almost surely for all i, and let $S_n = X_1 + \cdots + X_n$.

Then for s, t > 0, Markov's inequality and the independence of X_{i} implies:

$$\begin{align}
\operatorname{P}\left(S_n-\mathrm{E}\left [S_n \right ]\geq t \right) &= \operatorname{P} \left (\exp(s(S_n-\mathrm{E}\left [S_n \right ])) \geq \exp(st) \right)\\
&\leq \exp(-st)\mathrm{E} \left [\exp(s(S_n-\mathrm{E}\left [S_n \right ])) \right ]\\
&= \exp(-st) \prod_{i=1}^n\mathrm{E} \left [\exp(s(X_i-\mathrm{E}\left [X_i\right])) \right ]\\
&\leq \exp(-st) \prod_{i=1}^n \exp\Big(\frac{s^2 (b_i-a_i)^2}{8}\Big)\\
&= \exp\left(-st+\tfrac{1}{8} s^2 \sum_{i=1}^n(b_i-a_i)^2\right)
\end{align}$$

This upper bound is the best for the value of s minimizing the value inside the exponential. This can be done easily by optimizing a quadratic, giving

$$s=\frac{4t}{\sum_{i=1}^n(b_i-a_i)^2}.$$

Writing the above bound for this value of s, we get the desired bound:

$$\operatorname{P} \left(S_n-\mathrm{E}\left [S_n \right ]\geq t \right)\leq \exp\left(-\frac{2t^2}{\sum_{i=1}^n(b_i-a_i)^2}\right).$$

This proof easily generalizes to the case for sub-Gaussian distributions with variance proxy.

== Usage ==
=== Confidence intervals ===
Hoeffding's inequality can be used to derive confidence intervals. We consider a coin that shows heads with probability p and tails with probability 1 − p. We toss the coin n times, generating n samples $X_1,\ldots,X_n$ (which are i.i.d Bernoulli random variables). The expected number of times the coin comes up heads is pn. Furthermore, the probability that the coin comes up heads at least k times can be exactly quantified by the following expression:

$$\operatorname{P}( H(n) \geq k)= \sum_{i=k}^n \binom{n}{i} p^i (1-p)^{n-i},$$

where H(n) is the number of heads in n coin tosses.

When k = (p + ε)n for some ε > 0, Hoeffding's inequality bounds this probability by a term that is exponentially small in ε^{2}n:

$$\operatorname{P}( H(n) - pn >\varepsilon n)\leq\exp\left(-2\varepsilon^2 n\right).$$

Since this bound holds on both sides of the mean, Hoeffding's inequality implies that the number of heads that we see is concentrated around its mean, with exponentially small tail.

$$\operatorname{P}\left(|H(n) - pn| >\varepsilon n\right)\leq 2\exp\left(-2\varepsilon^2 n\right).$$

Thinking of $\overline{X} = \frac{1}{n}H(n)$ as the "observed" mean, this probability can be interpreted as the level of significance $\alpha$ (probability of making an error) for a confidence interval around $p$ of size 2ɛ:

$$\alpha=\operatorname{P}(\ \overline{X} \notin [p-\varepsilon, p+\varepsilon]) \leq 2e^{-2\varepsilon^2n}$$

Finding n for opposite inequality sign in the above, i.e. n that violates inequality but not equality above, gives us:

$$n\geq \frac{\log(2/\alpha)}{2\varepsilon^2}$$

Therefore, we require at least $\textstyle \frac{\log(2/\alpha)}{2\varepsilon^2}$ samples to acquire a $\textstyle (1-\alpha)$-confidence interval $\textstyle p \pm \varepsilon$.

Hence, the cost of acquiring the confidence interval is sublinear in terms of confidence level and quadratic in terms of precision. Note that there are more efficient methods of estimating a confidence interval.

== See also ==
- Concentration inequality – a summary of tail-bounds on random variables.
- Hoeffding's lemma
- Bernstein inequalities (probability theory)
