= Khintchine inequality =

Theorem in probability

The Khintchine inequality, is a result in probability also frequently used in analysis bounding the expectation a weighted sum of Rademacher random variables with square-summable weights. It is named after Aleksandr Khinchin and spelled in multiple ways in the Latin alphabet.

It states that for each $p\in (0,\infty)$ there exist constants $A_p,B_p>0$ depending only on $p$ such that for every sequence $x = (x_1, x_2, \dots)\in\ell^2$, and i.i.d. Rademacher random variables $\epsilon_1, \epsilon_2, \dots$,

$A_p\leq \frac{\mathbb E\left[\left|\sum_{n=1}^\infty \epsilon_n x_n\right|^p\right]^{1/p}}{\|x\|_2}\leq B_p.$

As a particular case, consider $N$ complex numbers $x_1,\dots,x_N \in\mathbb{C}$, which can be pictured as vectors in a plane. Now sample $N$ random signs $\epsilon_1, \dots, \epsilon_N \in \{-1, +1\}$, with equal independent probability. The inequality states that $\Big|\sum_i \epsilon_i x_i \Big| \approx \sqrt{|x_1|^{2}+\cdots + |x_N|^{2}}$ with a bounded error.

== Statement ==
Let $\{\varepsilon_n\}_{n=1}^N$ be i.i.d. random variables with $P(\varepsilon_n=\pm1)=\frac12$ for $n=1,\ldots, N$, i.e., a sequence with Rademacher distribution. Let $0<p<\infty$ and let $x_1,\ldots,x_N\in \mathbb{C}$. Then

$$A_p \left( \sum_{n=1}^N |x_n|^2 \right)^{1/2} \leq \left(\operatorname{E} \left|\sum_{n=1}^N \varepsilon_n x_n\right|^p \right)^{1/p}  \leq B_p \left(\sum_{n=1}^N |x_n|^2\right)^{1/2}$$

for some constants $A_p,B_p>0$ depending only on $p$ (see Expected value for notation). More succinctly, $\left(\operatorname{E} \left|\sum_{n=1}^N \varepsilon_n x_n\right|^p \right)^{1/p} \in [A_p, B_p]$for any sequence $x$ with unit $\ell^2$ norm.

The sharp values of the constants $A_p,B_p$ were found by Haagerup (Ref. 2; see Ref. 3 for a simpler proof). It is a simple matter to see that $A_p = 1$ when $p \ge 2$, and $B_p = 1$ when $0 < p \le 2$.

Haagerup found that

$$\begin{align}
A_p &= \begin{cases}
2^{1/2-1/p} & 0<p\le p_0, \\
2^{1/2}(\Gamma((p+1)/2)/\sqrt{\pi})^{1/p} & p_0 < p < 2\\
1 & 2 \le p < \infty
\end{cases}
\\
&\text{and}
\\
B_p &= \begin{cases}
1 & 0 < p \le 2 \\
2^{1/2}(\Gamma((p+1)/2)/\sqrt\pi)^{1/p} & 2 < p < \infty
\end{cases},
\end{align}$$

where $p_0\approx 1.847$ and $\Gamma$ is the Gamma function. One may note in particular that $B_p$ matches exactly the moments of a normal distribution.

== Uses in analysis ==
The uses of this inequality are not limited to applications in probability theory. One example of its use in analysis is the following: if we let $T$ be a linear operator between two L^{p} spaces $L^p(X,\mu)$ and $L^p(Y,\nu)$, $1 < p < \infty$, with bounded norm $\|T\|<\infty$, then one can use Khintchine's inequality to show that

$$\left\|\left(\sum_{n=1}^N |Tf_n|^2 \right)^{1/2} \right\|_{L^p(Y,\nu)}\leq C_p \left\|\left(\sum_{n=1}^N |f_n|^2\right)^{1/2} \right\|_{L^p(X,\mu)}$$

for some constant $C_p>0$ depending only on $p$ and $\|T\|$.

== Generalizations ==
For the case of Rademacher random variables, Pawel Hitczenko showed that the sharpest version is:

$$A \left(\sqrt{p}\left(\sum_{n=b+1}^N x_n^2\right)^{1/2} + \sum_{n=1}^b x_n\right)
\leq \left(\operatorname{E} \left|\sum_{n=1}^N \varepsilon_n x_n\right|^p \right)^{1/p}
\leq B \left(\sqrt{p}\left(\sum_{n=b+1}^N x_n^2\right)^{1/2} + \sum_{n=1}^b x_n\right)$$

where $b = \lfloor p\rfloor$, and $A$ and $B$ are universal constants independent of $p$.

Here we assume that the $x_i$ are non-negative and non-increasing.

== See also ==
- Marcinkiewicz–Zygmund inequality
- Burkholder-Davis-Gundy inequality
