= Bernstein inequalities (probability theory) =

Inequalities in probability theory

In probability theory, Bernstein inequalities give bounds on the probability that the sum of random variables deviates from its mean. In the simplest case, let X_{1}, ..., X_{n} be independent Bernoulli random variables taking values +1 and −1 with probability 1/2 (this distribution is also known as the Rademacher distribution), then for every positive $\varepsilon$,

$$\mathbb{P}\left (\left|\frac{1}{n}\sum_{i=1}^n X_i\right| > \varepsilon \right ) \leq 2\exp \left (-\frac{n\varepsilon^2}{2(1+\frac{\varepsilon}{3})} \right).$$

Bernstein inequalities were proven and published by Sergei Bernstein in the 1920s and 1930s. Later, these inequalities were rediscovered several times in various forms. Thus, special cases of the Bernstein inequalities are also known as the Chernoff bound, Hoeffding's inequality and Azuma's inequality. The martingale case of the Bernstein inequality is known as Freedman's inequality and its refinement is known as Hoeffding's inequality.

== Some of the inequalities ==
1. Let $X_1, \ldots, X_n$ be independent zero-mean random variables. Suppose that $|X_i|\leq M$ almost surely, for all $i.$ Then, for all positive $t$,

$$\mathbb{P} \left (\sum_{i=1}^n X_i \geq t \right ) \leq \exp \left ( -\frac{\tfrac{1}{2} t^2}{\sum_{i = 1}^n \mathbb{E} \left[X_i^2 \right ]+\tfrac{1}{3} Mt} \right ).$$

2. Let $X_1, \ldots, X_n$ be independent zero-mean random variables. Suppose that for some positive real $L$ and every integer $k \geq 2$,

$$\mathbb{E} \left[ \left |X_i^k \right |\right ] \leq \frac{1}{2} \mathbb{E} \left[X_i^2\right] L^{k-2} k!$$

Then

$$\mathbb{P} \left (\sum_{i=1}^n X_i \geq 2t \sqrt{\sum \mathbb{E} \left [X_i^2 \right ]} \right ) < \exp(-t^2), \qquad \text{for}\quad 0 \leq t \leq \frac{1}{2L}\sqrt{\sum \mathbb{E} \left[X_j^2\right ]}.$$

3. Let $X_1, \ldots, X_n$ be independent zero-mean random variables. Suppose that

$$\mathbb{E} \left[ \left |X_i^k \right |\right ] \leq \frac{k!}{4!} \left(\frac{L}{5}\right)^{k-4}$$

for all integer $k \geq 4.$ Denote

$$A_k = \sum \mathbb{E} \left [ X_i^k\right ].$$

Then,

$$\mathbb{P} \left( \left| \sum_{j=1}^n X_j - \frac{A_3 t^2}{3A_2} \right|\geq \sqrt{2A_2} \, t \left[ 1 + \frac{A_4 t^2}{6 A_2^2} \right] \right) < 2 \exp (- t^2), \qquad \text{for} \quad 0 < t \leq \frac{5 \sqrt{2A_2}}{4L}.$$

4. Bernstein also proved generalizations of the inequalities above to weakly dependent random variables. For example, inequality (2) can be extended as follows. Let $X_1, \ldots, X_n$ be possibly non-independent random variables. Suppose that for all integers $i>0$,

$$\begin{align}
\mathbb{E} \left. \left [ X_i   \right | X_1, \ldots, X_{i-1} \right ] &= 0, \\
\mathbb{E} \left. \left [ X_i^2 \right | X_1, \ldots, X_{i-1} \right ] &\leq R_i \mathbb{E} \left [ X_i^2 \right ], \\
\mathbb{E} \left. \left [ X_i^k \right | X_1, \ldots, X_{i-1} \right ] &\leq \tfrac{1}{2} \mathbb{E} \left. \left[ X_i^2 \right | X_1, \ldots, X_{i-1} \right ] L^{k-2} k!
\end{align}$$

Then

$$\mathbb{P} \left( \sum_{i=1}^n X_i \geq 2t \sqrt{\sum_{i=1}^n R_i \mathbb{E}\left [ X_i^2 \right ]} \right) < \exp(-t^2), \qquad \text{for}\quad  0 < t \leq \frac{1}{2L} \sqrt{\sum_{i=1}^n R_i \mathbb{E} \left [X_i^2 \right ]}.$$

More general results for martingales can be found in Fan et al. (2015).

== Proofs ==
The proofs are based on an application of Markov's inequality to the random variable

$$\exp \left ( \lambda \sum_{j=1}^n X_j \right ),$$

for a suitable choice of the parameter $\lambda > 0$.

== Generalizations ==
The Bernstein inequality can be generalized to Gaussian random matrices. Let $G = g^H A g + 2 \operatorname{Re}(g^H a)$ be a scalar where $A$ is a complex Hermitian matrix and $a$ is complex vector of size $N$. The vector $g \sim \mathcal{CN}(0,I)$ is a Gaussian vector of size $N$. Then for any $\sigma \geq 0$, we have

$$\mathbb{P} \left( G \leq \operatorname{tr}(A) - \sqrt{2\sigma}\sqrt{\Vert \operatorname{vec}(A) \Vert^2 + 2 \Vert a \Vert^2 } - \sigma s^-(A) \right) < \exp(-\sigma),$$

where $\operatorname{vec}$ is the vectorization operation and $s^- (A) = \max(-\lambda_{\max}(A),0)$ where $\lambda_{\max}(A)$ is the largest eigenvalue of $A$. The proof is detailed here. Another similar inequality is formulated as

$$\mathbb{P} \left( G \geq \operatorname{tr}(A) + \sqrt{2\sigma}\sqrt{\Vert \operatorname{vec}(A) \Vert^2 + 2 \Vert a \Vert^2 } + \sigma s^+(A) \right) < \exp(-\sigma),$$

where $s^+(A) = \max(\lambda_{\max}(A),0)$.

== See also ==
- Concentration inequality - a summary of tail-bounds on random variables.
- Hoeffding's inequality
