= Mixture =

Substance formed when two or more constituents are physically combined

In chemistry, a mixture is a material made up of two or more different chemical substances which can be separated by physical method. It is an impure substance made up of two or more elements or compounds mechanically mixed together in any proportion. A mixture is the physical combination of two or more substances in which the identities are retained and are mixed in the form of solutions, suspensions or colloids.

Mixtures are one product of mechanically blending or mixing chemical substances such as elements and compounds, without chemical bonding or other chemical change, so that each ingredient substance retains its own chemical properties and makeup. Despite the fact that there are no chemical changes to its constituents, the physical properties of a mixture, such as its melting point, may differ from those of the components. Some mixtures can be separated into their components by using physical (mechanical or thermal) means. Azeotropes are one kind of mixture that usually poses considerable difficulties regarding the separation processes required to obtain their constituents (physical or chemical processes or, even a blend of them).

== Characteristics of mixtures ==
All mixtures can be characterized as being separable by mechanical means (e.g. purification, distillation, electrolysis, chromatography, heat, filtration, gravitational sorting, centrifugation). Mixtures differ from chemical compounds in the following ways:

- The substances in a mixture can be separated using physical methods such as filtration, freezing, and distillation.
- There is little or no energy change when a mixture forms (see Enthalpy of mixing).
- The substances in a mixture keep their separate properties.

In the example of sand and water, neither one of the two substances changed in any way when they are mixed. Although the sand is in the water it still keeps the same properties that it had when it was outside the water.

- mixtures have variable compositions, while compounds have a fixed, definite formula.
- when mixed, individual substances keep their properties in a mixture, while if they form a compound their properties can change.

The following table shows the main properties and examples for all possible phase combinations of the three "families" of mixtures :

Mixtures Table
Dispersion medium (mixture phase)	Dissolved or dispersed phase	Solution	Colloid	Suspension (coarse dispersion)
Gas	Gas	Gas mixture: air (oxygen and other gases in nitrogen)	None	None
Gas	Liquid	None	Liquid aerosol: fog, mist, vapor, hair sprays	Spray
Gas	Solid	None	Solid aerosol: smoke, ice cloud, air particulates	Dust
Liquid	Gas	Solution: oxygen in water	Liquid foam: whipped cream, shaving cream	Sea foam, beer head
Liquid	Liquid	Solution: alcoholic beverages	Emulsion: milk, mayonnaise, hand cream	Vinaigrette
Liquid	Solid	Solution: sugar in water	Liquid sol: pigmented ink, blood	Suspension: mud (soil particles suspended in water), chalk powder suspended in water
Solid	Gas	Solution: hydrogen in metals	Solid foam: aerogel, styrofoam, pumice	Foam: dry sponge
Solid	Liquid	Solution: amalgam (mercury in gold), hexane in paraffin wax	Gel: agar, gelatin, silicagel, opal	Wet sponge
Solid	Solid	Solution: alloys, plasticizers in plastics	Solid sol: cranberry glass	Clay, silt, sand, gravel, granite

== Homogeneous and heterogeneous mixtures ==
A diagram representing at the microscopic level the differences between homogeneous mixtures, heterogeneous mixtures, compounds, and elements.

Mixtures can be either homogeneous or heterogeneous: a mixture of uniform composition and in which all components are in the same phase, such as salt in water, is called homogeneous, whereas a mixture of non-uniform composition and of which the components can be easily identified, such as sand in water, it is called heterogeneous.

In addition, "uniform mixture" is another term for homogeneous mixture and "non-uniform mixture" is another term for heterogeneous mixture. These terms are derived from the idea that a homogeneous mixture has a uniform appearance, or only one phase, because the particles are evenly distributed. However, a heterogeneous mixture has constituent substances that are in different phases and easily distinguishable from one another. In addition, a heterogeneous mixture may have a uniform (e.g. a colloid) or non-uniform (e.g. a pencil) composition.

Several solid substances, such as salt and sugar, dissolve in water to form homogeneous mixtures or "solutions", in which there are both a solute (dissolved substance) and a solvent (dissolving medium) present. Air is an example of a solution as well: a homogeneous mixture of gaseous nitrogen solvent, in which oxygen and smaller amounts of other gaseous solutes are dissolved. Mixtures are not limited in either their number of substances or the amounts of those substances, though in most solutions, the solute-to-solvent proportion can only reach a certain point before the mixture separates and becomes heterogeneous.

A homogeneous mixture is characterized by uniform dispersion of its constituent substances throughout; the substances exist in equal proportion everywhere within the mixture. Differently put, a homogeneous mixture will be the same no matter from where in the mixture it is sampled. For example, if a solid-liquid solution is divided into two halves of equal volume, the halves will contain equal amounts of both the liquid medium and dissolved solid (solvent and solute)

=== Homogeneous mixtures ===
==== Solutions ====
A solution is equivalent to a "homogeneous mixture". In solutions, solutes will not settle out after any period of time and they cannot be removed by physical methods, such as a filter or centrifuge. As a homogeneous mixture, a solution has one phase (solid, liquid, or gas), although the phase of the solute and solvent may initially have been different (e.g., salt water).

==== Gases ====
Gases exhibit by far the greatest space (and, consequently, the weakest intermolecular forces) between their atoms or molecules; since intermolecular interactions are minuscule in comparison to those in liquids and solids, dilute gases very easily form solutions with one another. Air is one such example: it can be more specifically described as a gaseous solution of oxygen and other gases dissolved in nitrogen (its major component).

=== Heterogeneous mixtures ===
Making an heterogeneous mixture of water and oil

Examples of heterogeneous mixtures are emulsions and foams. In most cases, the mixture consists of two main constituents. For an emulsion, these are immiscible fluids such as water and oil. For a foam, these are a solid and a fluid, or a liquid and a gas. On larger scales both constituents are present in any region of the mixture, and in a well-mixed mixture in the same or only slightly varying concentrations. On a microscopic scale, however, one of the constituents is absent in almost any sufficiently small region. (If such absence is common on macroscopic scales, the combination of the constituents is a dispersed medium, not a mixture.) One can distinguish different characteristics of heterogeneous mixtures by the presence or absence of continuum percolation of their constituents. For a foam, a distinction is made between reticulated foam in which one constituent forms a connected network through which the other can freely percolate, or a closed-cell foam in which one constituent is present as trapped in small cells whose walls are formed by the other constituents. A similar distinction is possible for emulsions. In many emulsions, one constituent is present in the form of isolated regions of typically a globular shape, dispersed throughout the other constituent. However, it is also possible each constituent forms a large, connected network. Such a mixture is then called bicontinuous.

== Distinguishing between mixture types ==
Making a distinction between homogeneous and heterogeneous mixtures is a matter of the scale of sampling. On a coarse enough scale, any mixture can be said to be homogeneous, if the entire article is allowed to count as a "sample" of it. On a fine enough scale, any mixture can be said to be heterogeneous, because a sample could be as small as a single molecule. In practical terms, if the property of interest of the mixture is the same regardless of which sample of it is taken for the examination used, the mixture is homogeneous.

Gy's sampling theory quantitatively defines the heterogeneity of a particle as:
$$h_i = \frac{(c_i - c_\text{batch})m_i}{c_\text{batch} m_\text{aver}},$$
where $h_i$, $c_i$, $c_\text{batch}$, $m_i$, and $m_\text{aver}$ are respectively: the heterogeneity of the $i$th particle of the population, the mass concentration of the property of interest in the $i$th particle of the population, the mass concentration of the property of interest in the population, the mass of the $i$th particle in the population, and the average mass of a particle in the population.

During sampling of heterogeneous mixtures of particles, the variance of the sampling error is generally non-zero.

Pierre Gy derived, from the Poisson sampling model, the following formula for the variance of the sampling error in the mass concentration in a sample:
$$V = \frac{1}{(\sum_{i=1}^N q_i m_i)^2} \sum_{i=1}^N q_i(1-q_i) m_{i}^{2} \left(a_i - \frac{\sum_{j=1}^N q_j a_j m_j}{\sum_{j=1}^N q_j m_j}\right)^2,$$
in which V is the variance of the sampling error, N is the number of particles in the population (before the sample was taken), q_{i} is the probability of including the ith particle of the population in the sample (i.e. the first-order inclusion probability of the ith particle), m_{i} is the mass of the ith particle of the population and a_{i} is the mass concentration of the property of interest in the ith particle of the population.

The above equation for the variance of the sampling error is an approximation based on a linearization of the mass concentration in a sample.

In the theory of Gy, correct sampling is defined as a sampling scenario in which all particles have the same probability of being included in the sample. This implies that q_{i} no longer depends on i, and can therefore be replaced by the symbol q. Gy's equation for the variance of the sampling error becomes:
$$V = \frac{1-q}{q M_\text{batch}^2} \sum_{i=1}^N m_{i}^{2} \left(a_i - a_\text{batch} \right)^2,$$
where a_{batch} is that concentration of the property of interest in the population from which the sample is to be drawn and M_{batch} is the mass of the population from which the sample is to be drawn.

== Toxicology ==
Air pollution research shows biological and health effects after exposure to mixtures of pollutants are more potent than effects from exposures of individual components.

== Properties of a mixture ==
- Chemical substance
- Mixing (process engineering)
