= Gy's sampling theory =

Gy's sampling theory is a theory about the sampling of materials, developed by Pierre Gy from the 1950s to beginning 2000s in articles and books including:

- (1960) Sampling nomogram
- (1979) Sampling of particulate materials; theory and practice
- (1982) Sampling of particulate materials; theory and practice; 2nd edition
- (1992) Sampling of Heterogeneous and Dynamic Material Systems: Theories of Heterogeneity, Sampling and Homogenizing
- (1998) Sampling for Analytical Purposes

The abbreviation "TOS" is also used to denote Gy's sampling theory.

Gy's sampling theory uses a model in which the sample taking is represented by independent Bernoulli trials for every particle in the parent population from which the sample is drawn. The two possible outcomes of each Bernoulli trial are: (1) the particle is selected and (2) the particle is not selected. The probability of selecting a particle may be different during each Bernoulli trial. The model used by Gy is mathematically equivalent to Poisson sampling. Using this model, the following equation for the variance of the sampling error in the mass concentration in a sample was derived by Gy:

$$V = \frac{1}{(\sum_{i=1}^N q_i m_i)^2} \sum_{i=1}^N q_i(1-q_i) m_{i}^{2} \left(a_i - \frac{\sum_{j=1}^N q_j a_j m_j}{\sum_{j=1}^N q_j m_j}\right)^2 .$$

in which V is the variance of the sampling error, N is the number of particles in the population (before the sample was taken), q_{i} is the probability of including the ith particle of the population in the sample (i.e. the first-order inclusion probability of the ith particle), m_{i} is the mass of the ith particle of the population and a_{i} is the mass concentration of the property of interest in the ith particle of the population.

It is noted that the above equation for the variance of the sampling error is an approximation based on a linearization of the mass concentration in a sample.

In the theory of Gy, correct sampling is defined as a sampling scenario in which all particles have the same probability of being included in the sample. This implies that q_{i} no longer depends on i, and can therefore be replaced by the symbol q. Gy's equation for the variance of the sampling error becomes:

$$V = \frac{1-q}{q M_\text{batch}^2} \sum_{i=1}^N m_{i}^{2} \left(a_i - a_\text{batch} \right)^2 .$$

where a_{batch} is the concentration of the property of interest in the population from which the sample is to be drawn and M_{batch} is the mass of the population from which the sample is to be drawn. It has been noted that a similar equation had already been derived in 1935 by Kassel and Guy.

Two books covering the theory and practice of sampling are available; one is the Third Edition of a high-level monograph and the other an introductory text.

== See also ==
- Statistical sampling
