= Probability-proportional-to-size sampling =

In survey methodology

In survey methodology, probability-proportional-to-size (pps) sampling is a sampling process where each element of the population (of size N) has some (independent) chance $p_i$ to be selected to the sample when performing one draw. This $p_i$ is proportional to some known quantity $x_i$ so that $p_i = \frac{x_i}{\sum_{i=1}^N x_i}$.

One of the cases this occurs in, as developed by Hanson and Hurwitz in 1943, is when we have several clusters of units, each with a different (known upfront) number of units, then each cluster can be selected with a probability that is proportional to the number of units inside it. So, for example, if we have 3 clusters with 10, 20 and 30 units each, then the chance of selecting the first cluster will be 1/6, the second would be 1/3, and the third cluster will be 1/2.

The pps sampling results in a fixed sample size n (as opposed to Poisson sampling which is similar but results in a random sample size with expectancy of n). When selecting items with replacement the selection procedure is to just draw one item at a time (like getting n draws from a multinomial distribution with N elements, each with their own $p_i$ selection probability). If doing a without-replacement sampling, the schema can become more complex.

Another sampling method, Reservoir sampling, is 'Weighted random sampling with a reservoir', which offers an algorithm for drawing a weighted random sample of size m from a population of n weighted items, where m⩽n, in one-pass over unknown population size.

== Distribution and properties ==
If observations from some distribution F are sampled in a way that is proportional to their value, then the distribution of the values in that sample follows a Length-biased distribution, with the following density function:

$g(x) = x f(x) / E[x]$

Also: $E[g(x)] = E[x^2] / E[x]$

Notice that this would assume that the PPS sampling is done with replacement (or if the sample size is much smaller than the population size).

== See also ==
- Poisson sampling
- Bernoulli sampling
- Poisson distribution
- Poisson process
- Sampling design
- Sampling bias
- Renewal_theory#Inspection_paradox
