= Poisson sampling =

Survey methodology process

In survey methodology, Poisson sampling (sometimes denoted as PO sampling) is a sampling process where each element of the population is subjected to an independent Bernoulli trial which determines whether the element becomes part of the sample.

Each element of the population may have a different probability of being included in the sample ($\pi_i$). The probability of being included in a sample during the drawing of a single sample is denoted as the first-order inclusion probability of that element ($p_i$). If all first-order inclusion probabilities are equal, Poisson sampling becomes equivalent to Bernoulli sampling, which can therefore be considered to be a special case of Poisson sampling.

The name conveys that the number of samples leads to a Poisson binomial distribution, which can approximate the Poisson distribution (via Le Cam's theorem).

== A mathematical consequence of Poisson sampling ==
Mathematically, the first-order inclusion probability of the ith element of the population is denoted by the symbol $\pi_i$ and the second-order inclusion probability that a pair consisting of the ith and jth element of the population that is sampled is included in a sample during the drawing of a single sample is denoted by $\pi_{ij}$.

The following relation is valid during Poisson sampling when $i\neq j$ (i.e., Independence):

$$\pi_{ij} = \pi_{i} \times \pi_{j}.$$

$\pi_{ii}$ is defined to be $\pi_i$.

== See also ==
- Bernoulli sampling
- Poisson distribution
- Poisson process
- Sampling design
- Probability-proportional-to-size sampling
