= Pierre Gy =

Chemist and statistician

Pierre Maurice Gy (French: [pjɛʁ ʒi]; 25 July 1924 – 5 November 2015) was a chemist and statistician. Born in Paris, France, to Felix and Clemence, Gy graduated in chemical engineering from ESPCI ParisTech in 1946.

On graduation, Gy worked as a chemical engineer for the Compagnie Minière du Congo Français, Congo, before returning to Paris in 1949 as a research engineer for the mining and processing trade organisation Minerais et Metaux. It was during this time that Gy started to address fundamental issues in sampling, especially those concerned with characterising industrial bulk chemicals, aggregates and chemical processes. Gy became head of the mineral processing laboratories and, by 1962, technical manager, during which time he continued to develop his sampling theory. Since 1963 he has worked as an industrial sampling consultant.

Gy received doctorates in physics (1960) and mathematics (1975) from the University of Nancy but has always worked outside the academic mainstream, publishing 9 books and over 175 papers, including:

- (1979) SAMPLING OF PARTICULATE MATERIALS; theory and practice
- (1992) Sampling of Heterogeneous and Dynamic Material Systems: Theories of Heterogeneity, Sampling and Homogenizing
- (1998) Sampling for Analytical Purposes

In August 2003, the First World Conference on Sampling and Blending (WCSB1) was held in honour of Dr Pierre Gy in Esbjerg. WCSB2 was held in Queensland, Australia (May 2005) and WCSB3 in Porto Alegre, Brazil (October 2007). WCSB4 took place in 2009, WCSB5 in Santiago, Chile and WCSB6 in Lima, Peru. Pierre Gy's work was still the subject of debate and recognition at WCSB7 in Bordeaux, July 2015. He will remain one of the founding fathers of sampling science.
