= Correct sampling =

Sampling scenario in Gy's sampling theory

During sampling of granular materials (whether airborne, suspended in liquid, aerosol, or aggregated), correct sampling is defined in Gy's sampling theory as a sampling scenario in which all particles in a population have the same probability of ending up in the sample.

The concentration of the property of interest in a sample can be a biased estimate for the concentration of the property of interest in the population from which the sample is drawn. Although generally non-zero, for correct sampling this bias is thought to be negligible.

== See also ==
- Particle filter
- Particle in a box
- Particulate matter sampler
- Statistical sampling
- Gy's sampling theory
