= Sampling probability =

Theory relating to sampling from finite populations

In statistics, in the theory relating to sampling from finite populations, the sampling probability (also known as inclusion probability) of an element or member of the population, is its probability of becoming part of the sample during the drawing of a single sample. For example, in simple random sampling the probability of a particular unit $i$ to be selected into the sample is

$$p_{i} = \frac{\binom{N-1}{n-1}}{\binom{N}{n}} = \frac{n}{N}$$

where $n$ is the sample size and $N$ is the population size.

Each element of the population may have a different probability of being included in the sample. The inclusion probability is also termed the "first-order inclusion probability" to distinguish it from the "second-order inclusion probability", i.e. the probability of including a pair of elements. Generally, the first-order inclusion probability of the ith element of the population is denoted by the symbol π_{i} and the second-order inclusion probability that a pair consisting of the ith and jth element of the population that is sampled is included in a sample during the drawing of a single sample is denoted by π_{ij}.

== See also ==
- Sampling bias
- Sampling design
- Sampling frame
