= Sampling design =

In the theory of finite population sampling, a sampling design specifies for every possible sample its probability of being drawn.

== Mathematical formulation ==
Mathematically, a sampling design is denoted by the function $P(S)$ which gives the probability of drawing a sample $S.$

== An example of a sampling design ==
During Bernoulli sampling, $P(S)$ is given by

$$P(S) = q^{N_\text{sample}(S)} \times (1-q)^{(N_\text{pop} - N_\text{sample}(S))}$$

where for each element $q$ is the probability of being included in the sample and $N_\text{sample}(S)$ is the total number of elements in the sample $S$ and $N_\text{pop}$ is the total number of elements in the population (before sampling commenced).

== Sample design for managerial research ==
In business research, companies must often generate samples of customers, clients, employees, and so forth to gather their opinions. Sample design is also a critical component of marketing research and employee research for many organizations. During sample design, firms must answer questions such as:

- What is the relevant population, sampling frame, and sampling unit?
- What is the appropriate margin of error that should be achieved?
- How should sampling error and non-sampling error be assessed and balanced?

These issues require very careful consideration, and good commentaries are provided in several sources.

== See also ==
- Bernoulli sampling
- Sampling probability
- Sampling (statistics)
