= Ambit field =

In mathematics, an ambit field is a d-dimensional random field describing the stochastic properties of a given system. The input is in general a d-dimensional vector (e.g. d-dimensional space or (1-dimensional) time and (d − 1)-dimensional space) assigning a real value to each of the points in the field. In its most general form, the ambit field, $Y$, is defined by a constant plus a stochastic integral, where the integration is done with respect to a Lévy basis, plus a smooth term given by an ordinary Lebesgue integral. The integrations are done over so-called ambit sets, which is used to model the sphere of influence (hence the name, ambit, Latin for "sphere of influence" or "boundary") which affect a given point.

The use and development of ambit fields is motivated by the need of flexible stochastic models to describe turbulence and the evolution of electricity prices for use in e.g. risk management and derivative pricing. It was pioneered by Ole E. Barndorff-Nielsen and Jürgen Schmiegel to model turbulence and tumour growth.

Note, that this article will use notation that includes time as a dimension, i.e. we consider (d − 1)-dimensional space together with 1-dimensional time. The theory and notation easily carries over to d-dimensional space (either including time herin or in a setting involving no time at all).

== Intuition and motivation ==
In stochastic analysis, the usual way to model a random process, or field, is done by specifying the dynamics of the process through a stochastic (partial) differential equation (SPDE). It is known, that solutions of (partial) differential equations can in some cases be given as an integral of a Green's function convolved with another function – if the differential equation is stochastic, i.e. contaminated by random noise (e.g. white noise) the corresponding solution would be a stochastic integral of the Green's function. This fact motivates the reason for modelling the field of interest directly through a stochastic integral, taking a similar form as a solution through a Green's Function, instead of first specifying a SPDE and then trying to find a solution to this. This provides a very flexible and general framework for modelling a variety of phenomena.

== Definition ==
A tempo-spatial ambit field, $Y$, is a random field in space-time $\chi \times \mathbb{R}$ taking values in $\mathbb{R}$. Let $\mu \in \mathbb{R}, A_t (x), B_t (x)$ be ambit sets in $\chi \times \mathbb{R}_{+}, g, q$ deterministic kernel functions, $a$ a stochastic function, $\sigma \geq 0$ a stochastic field (called the energy dissipation field in turbulence and volatility in finance) and $L$ a Lévy basis. Now, the ambit field $Y$ is

$$Y_t(x) = \mu + \int_{A_{t}(x)} g(\eta,s,x,t)\sigma_{s}(\eta) L(d\eta,ds) + \int_{B_t(x)} q(\eta,s,x,t)a_{s}(\eta) \, d\eta \, ds$$

=== Ambit sets ===
In the above, the ambit sets $A_t(x)$ and $B_t(x)$ describe the sphere of influence for a given point in space-time. I.e. at a given point, $(t,x) \in \chi \times \mathbb{R}$ the sets $A_t(x)$ and $B_t(x)$ are the points in space-time which affect the value of the ambit field at $(t,x), Y_t(x)$. When time is considered as one of the dimensions, the sets are often taken to only include time-coordinates which are at or prior to the current time, t, so as to preserve causality of the field (i.e. a given point in space-time can only be affected by events that happened prior to time $t$ and can thus not be affected by the future).

The ambit sets can be of a variety of forms and when using ambit fields for modelling purposes, the choice of ambit sets should be made in a way that captures the desired properties (e.g. stylized facts) of the system considered in the best possible way. In this sense, the sets can be used to make a particular model fit the data as closely as possible and thus provides a very flexible – yet general – way of specifying the model.

=== Ambit process ===
Often, the object of interest is not the ambit field itself, but instead a process taking a particular path through the field. Such a process is called an ambit process. As an example such a process can represent the price of a particular financial object – e.g. the price of a forward contract for a certain time and point in space, space representing things such as time to delivery, spot price, period of delivery etc. This motivates the following definition:

Let the ambit field, Y, be given as above and consider a curve in space-time $\tau(\theta) = (x(\theta), t(\theta)) \in \chi \times \mathbb{R}$. An ambit process is defined as the value of the field along the curve, i.e.

$$X_\theta = Y_{t(\theta)}(x(\theta))$$

=== Stochastic intermittency/volatility ===
The energy dissipation field/volatility, $\sigma$, is, in general, stochastic (called intermittency in the context of turbulence), and can be modelled as a stochastic variable or field. Particularly, it may itself be modelled by another ambit field, i.e.

$$\sigma^2_t(x) = \int_{C_t(x)} h(\eta,s,x,t) \tilde{L}(d\eta,ds)$$

where $\tilde{L}$ is a non-negative Lévy basis.

== Integration with respect to a Lévy basis ==
The stochastic integral, $\int_{A_{t}(x)} g(\eta,s,x,t)\sigma_{s}(\eta) L(d\eta,ds)$, in the definition of the ambit process is an integral of a stochastic field (the integrand) over Lévy basis (the integrator), and is thus more complicated than the usual stochastic Itô-integral. A new theory of integration was provided by Walsh (1987) where integration is done with respect to random fields and this theory can be extended to integration with respect to so-called Lévy bases, which is the main building block of the ambit field.

=== Definition of Lévy basis ===
A family $(\Lambda(A) : A \in \mathbb{B}_b(S))$ of random vectors in $\mathbb{R}^d$ is called a Lévy basis on $S$ if:

1. The law of $\Lambda(A)$ is infinitely divisible for all $A \in \mathbb{B}_{b}(S)$.
2. If $A_1 , A_2, \ldots, A_n \in \mathbb{B}_b(S)$ are disjoint, then $\Lambda(A_1), \Lambda(A_2),\ldots, \Lambda(A_n)$ are independent.
3. If $A_1 , A_2, \ldots \in \mathbb{B}_b(S)$ are disjoint with $\bigcup_{i=1}^\infty A_i \in \mathbb{B}_b(S)$, then

$\Lambda(\bigcup_{i=1}^\infty A_i) = \sum_{i=1}^\infty \Lambda(A_i)$, a.s.

where the convergence on the right hand side of 3. is a.s.

Note that properties 2. and 3. define an independently scattered random measure.

== A stationary example ==
In some data (e.g. commodity prices) there is often found a stationary component, which a good model should be able to capture. The ambit field can be made stationary in a straightforward way. Consider the ambit field $Y$, defined as

$$Y_t = \mu + \int_{A_{t}(x)} g(\eta,t-s,x)\sigma_{s}(\eta) L(d\eta,ds) + \int_{B_{t}(x)} q(\eta,t-s,x)a_{s}(\eta) \, d\eta \, ds$$

where the ambit sets, $A_{t}(x), B_{t}(x)$ are of the form $A_{t}(x) = A + (x,t)$ where the time-coordinates of $A$ are negative (same for $B$). Furthermore, we take $g(\eta,t,x) = q(\eta,t,x) = 0$ for $t \leq 0$ and that $\sigma$ and $a$ are also stationary random variables/fields. In particular, we can take $\sigma$ to be a stationary ambit field itself:

$$\sigma^2_{t}(x) = \int_{C_{t}(x)} h(\eta,t-s,x) \tilde{L}(d\eta,ds)$$

where $\tilde{L}$ is a non-negative Lévy basis and $h$ is a positive function.
