= RVT =

RVT may refer to:

- Regionalized variable theory, a geostatistical method used for interpolation in space.
- Remote and virtual tower
- Renal vein thrombosis
- Reusable Vehicle Testing, a Japanese Space Agency project from 1998 until 2003
- Royal Vauxhall Tavern
- Registered Veterinary Technician in the United States
- Ravensthorpe Airport, IATA airport code "RVT"
