= QMU =

QMU may stand for:

- Queen Margaret Union - in Glasgow
- Queen Margaret University - in Musselburgh
- Queen Mary, University of London
- Quantification of Margins and Uncertainties
