= Rational quadratic covariance function =

In statistics, the rational quadratic covariance function is used in spatial statistics, geostatistics, machine learning, image analysis, and other fields where multivariate statistical analysis is conducted on metric spaces. It is commonly used to define the statistical covariance between measurements made at two points that are d units distant from each other. Since the covariance only depends on distances between points, it is stationary. If the distance is Euclidean distance, the rational quadratic covariance function is also isotropic.

The rational quadratic covariance between two points separated by d distance units is given by

$$C(d) = \Bigg(1+\frac{d^2}{2\alpha k^2}\Bigg)^{-\alpha}$$

where α and k are non-negative parameters of the covariance.
