= George Karniadakis =

American mathematician

George Em Karniadakis
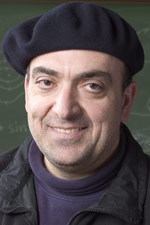
- George Em Karniadakis
- Born: Crete, Greece
- Scientific career
- Fields: Applied mathematics, Mechanical Engineering, Ocean Engineering
- Workplaces: Brown University, Massachusetts Institute of Technology
- Doctoral advisor: Anthony T. Patera; Borivoje B. Mikic

George Em Karniadakis (Γιώργος Εμμανουήλ Καρνιαδάκης) is a professor of applied mathematics at Brown University. He is a Greek-American researcher who is known for his wide-spectrum work on high-dimensional stochastic modeling and multiscale simulations of physical and biological systems, and is a pioneer of spectral/hp-element methods for fluids in complex geometries, general polynomial chaos for uncertainty quantification, and the Sturm-Liouville theory for partial differential equations and fractional calculus.

He is ranked as the leading and most influential researcher in mathematics worldwide, with over 200,000 citations as of 2026.

== Biography ==
George Em Karniadakis obtained his diploma of engineering in Mechanical Engineering and Naval Architecture from the National Technical University of Athens in 1982. Subsequently, he received his Scientiæ Magister in 1984 and his Ph.D. in Mechanical Engineering and Applied Mathematics in 1987 from the Massachusetts Institute of Technology (MIT) under the advice of Anthony T. Patera and Borivoje B. Mikic. He then joined the Center for Turbulence Research at Stanford University, NASA Ames Laboratory, as a postdoctoral research associate under the mentorship of Parviz Moin and John Kim.

In 1988, Karniadakis joined Princeton University as a tenure-track assistant professor in the Department of Mechanical and Aerospace Engineering, and as an associate faculty in the Program of Applied and Computational Mathematics. In 1993, he held a visiting professor appointment in the Aeronautics Department at the California Institute of Technology, before joining the Division of Applied Mathematics at Brown University as a tenured associate professor in 1994. He became a full professor of Applied Mathematics in 1996. Since 2000, he has been a visiting professor and senior lecturer of Ocean/Mechanical Engineering at MIT. He was entitled the Charles Pitts Robinson and John Palmer Barstow Professor of Applied Mathematics in 2014.

He is the lead principal investigator (PI) of an OSD/ARO/MURI on fractional PDEs, and the lead PI of an OSD/AFOSR MURI on Machine Learning for PDEs. He is the Director of the DOE center PhILMS on Physics-Informed Learning Machines and was previously the Director of the DOE Center of Mathematics for Mesoscale Modeling of Materials (CM4).

== Honors and awards ==
- Ralph E. Kleinman Prize, Society for Industrial and Applied Mathematics, 2015
- MCS Wiederhielm Award of the Microcirculatory Society "for the most highly cited original article in Microcirculation over the previous five year period for the paper", 2015
- US Association for Computational Mechanics, 2013, The J Tinsley Oden (inaugural) Medal.
- US Association for Computational Mechanics, 2007 Computational Fluid Dynamics award.
- Fellow of the Society for Applied and Industrial Mathematics (SIAM), 2010.
- Fellow of the American Physical Society (APS), 2004.
- Fellow of the American Society of Mechanical Engineers (ASME), 2003.
- Associate Fellow of the American Institute of Aeronautics and Astronautics (AIAA), 2006.

== Books ==
- Z. Zhang and G.E. Karniadakis, “Numerical Methods for Stochastic PDEs with White Noise”, Springer, Applied Mathematics Series, 2017.
- G.E. Karniadakis, A. Beskok, and N. Aluru, “Microflows and Nanoflows: Fundamentals and Simulation, Springer 2005.
- G.E. Karniadakis and R.M. Kirby, “Parallel Scientific Computing in C++ and MPI”, Cambridge University Press, March 2003.
- G.E. Karniadakis and A. Beskok, “Microflows: Fundamentals and Simulation”, Springer, 2001. (first textbook/monograph in this field).
- G.E. Karniadakis & S.J. Sherwin, “Spectral/hp Element Methods for CFD,” Oxford University Press, New York, 1999. (first monograph in this field); second edition, Oxford, 2005; third edition, 2013.

== Patents ==
- S. Suresh, L. Lu, M. Dao, and G.E. Karniadakis, “Solving inverse indentation Problems via Deep Learning with Applications to 3D printing and Other Engineering Projects, (NTU Ref: 2019-140) - June 24, 2019.
- M. Raissi, P. Perdikaris, and G.E. Karniadakis, Physics Informed Learning Machines U.S. Provisional Patent Application 6248319, March 29, 2017.
- G.E. Karniadakis and Y. Du, “Method and Apparatus for Reducing Turbulent Drag”, Patent No. 6,333,593 B1, Dec 25, 2001.
- G.E. Karniadakis, K. Breuer and V. Symeonidis, “Method and Apparatus for Reducing Turbulent Drag (continuing part)”, Patent No. 6,520,455 B2, Feb. 18, 2003.
- C. Chryssostomidis, D. Sura, G.E. Karniadakis, C. Jaskolski, R. Kimbal, “Lorentz Acoustic Transmitter for Underwater Communications”, Patent No. 7,505,365, March 17, 2009.
