= Danie G. Krige =

South African statistician and mining engineer

- Born: Danie Gerhardus Krige; 26 August 1919; Bothaville, (OFS), South Africa
- Died: 3 March 2013 (Age 93); Johannesburg, Gauteng, South Africa
- Education: University of the Witwatersrand
- Known for: Kriging
- Awards: Order for Meritorious Service, Class 1, Gold
- Scientific career
- Fields: Geostatistics
- Workplaces: Anglo Transvaal, University of the Witwatersrand

Danie Gerhardus Krige GCOB (Afrikaans: [ˈdɑːni ˈkriχə]; 26 August 1919 – 3 March 2013) was a South African statistician and mining engineer who pioneered the field of geostatistics and was professor at the University of the Witwatersrand, Republic of South Africa. The technique of kriging is named after him. Krige's empirical work to evaluate mineral resources was formalised in the 1960s by French engineer Georges Matheron.
