= Markov chain geostatistics =

Markov chain geostatistics uses Markov chain spatial models, simulation algorithms and associated spatial correlation measures (e.g., transiogram) based on the Markov chain random field theory, which extends a single Markov chain into a multi-dimensional random field for geostatistical modeling. A Markov chain random field is still a single spatial Markov chain. The spatial Markov chain moves or jumps in a space and decides its state at any unobserved location through interactions with its nearest known neighbors in different directions. The data interaction process can be well explained as a local sequential Bayesian updating process within a neighborhood. Because single-step transition probability matrices are difficult to estimate from sparse sample data and are impractical in representing the complex spatial heterogeneity of states, the transiogram, which is defined as a transition probability function over the distance lag, is proposed as the accompanying spatial measure of Markov chain random fields.

== See also ==
- Markov chain
- Markov random field
- Geostatistics
