= Regionalized variable theory =

Regionalized variable theory (RVT) is a geostatistical method used for interpolation in space.

The concept of the theory is that interpolation from points in space should not be based on a smooth continuous object. It should be, however, based on a stochastic model that takes into consideration the various trends in the original set of points. The theory considers that within any dataset, three types of relationships can be detected:

1. Structural part, which is also called the trend.
2. Correlated variation.
3. Uncorrelated variation, or noise.

After defining the above three relationships, RVT then applies the first law of geography, in order to predict the unknown values of points. The major application of this theory is the Kriging method for interpolation.
