= Random field =

Mathematical function

In physics and mathematics, a random field is a random function over an arbitrary domain (usually a multi-dimensional space such as $\mathbb{R}^n$). That is, it is a function $f(x)$ that takes on a random value at each point $x \in \mathbb{R}^n$(or some other domain). It is also sometimes thought of as a synonym for a stochastic process with some restriction on its index set. That is, by modern definitions, a random field is a generalization of a stochastic process where the underlying parameter need no longer be real or integer valued "time" but can instead take values that are multidimensional vectors or points on some manifold.

== Formal definition ==
Given a probability space $(\Omega, \mathcal{F}, P)$, an X-valued random field is a collection of X-valued random variables indexed by elements in a topological space T. That is, a random field F is a collection

$$\{ F_t : t \in T \}$$

where each $F_t$ is an X-valued random variable.

== Examples ==
In its discrete version, a random field is a list of random numbers whose indices are identified with a discrete set of points in a space (for example, n-dimensional Euclidean space). Suppose there are four random variables, $X_1$, $X_2$, $X_3$, and $X_4$, located in a 2D grid at (0,0), (0,2), (2,2), and (2,0), respectively. Suppose each random variable can take on the value of −1 or 1, and the probability of each random variable's value depends on its immediately adjacent neighbours. This is a simple example of a discrete random field.

More generally, the values each $X_i$ can take on might be defined over a continuous domain. In larger grids, it can also be useful to think of the random field as a "function valued" random variable as described above. In quantum field theory the notion is generalized to a random functional, one that takes on random values over a space of functions.

Several kinds of random fields exist, among them the Markov random field (MRF), Gibbs random field, conditional random field (CRF), and Gaussian random field. In 1974, Julian Besag proposed an approximation method relying on the relation between MRFs and Gibbs RFs.

=== Example properties ===
An MRF exhibits the Markov property

$$P(X_i=x_i|X_j=x_j, i\neq j) =P(X_i=x_i|X_j=x_j,j\in\partial_i), \,$$

for each choice of values $(x_j)_j$. Here each $\partial_i$ is the set of neighbors of $i$. In other words, the probability that a random variable assumes a value depends on its immediate neighboring random variables. The probability of a random variable in an MRF is given by

$$P(X_i=x_i|\partial_i) = \frac{P(X_i=x_i, \partial_i)}{\sum_k P(X_i=k, \partial_i)},$$

where the sum (can be an integral) is over the possible values of k. It is sometimes difficult to compute this quantity exactly.

== Applications ==
When used in the natural sciences, values in a random field are often spatially correlated. For example, adjacent values (i.e. values with adjacent indices) do not differ as much as values that are further apart. This is an example of a covariance structure, many different types of which may be modeled in a random field. One example is the Ising model where sometimes nearest neighbor interactions are only included as a simplification to better understand the model.

A common use of random fields is in the generation of computer graphics, particularly those that mimic natural surfaces such as water and earth. Random fields have been also used in subsurface ground models as in

In neuroscience, particularly in task-related functional brain imaging studies using PET or fMRI, statistical analysis of random fields are one common alternative to correction for multiple comparisons to find regions with truly significant activation. More generally, random fields can be used to correct for the look-elsewhere effect in statistical testing, where the domain is the parameter space being searched.

They are also used in machine learning applications.

== Tensor-valued random fields ==
Random fields are of great use in studying natural processes by the Monte Carlo method in which the random fields correspond to naturally spatially varying properties. This leads to tensor-valued random fields in which the key role is played by a statistical volume element (SVE), which is a spatial box over which properties can be averaged; when the SVE becomes sufficiently large, its properties become deterministic and one recovers the representative volume element (RVE) of deterministic continuum physics. The second type of random field that appears in continuum theories are those of dependent quantities (temperature, displacement, velocity, deformation, rotation, body and surface forces, stress, etc.).

== See also ==
- Covariance
- Kriging
- Variogram
- Resel
- Stochastic process
- Interacting particle system
- Stochastic cellular automata
