= Geostatistics =

Branch of statistics focusing on spatial data sets

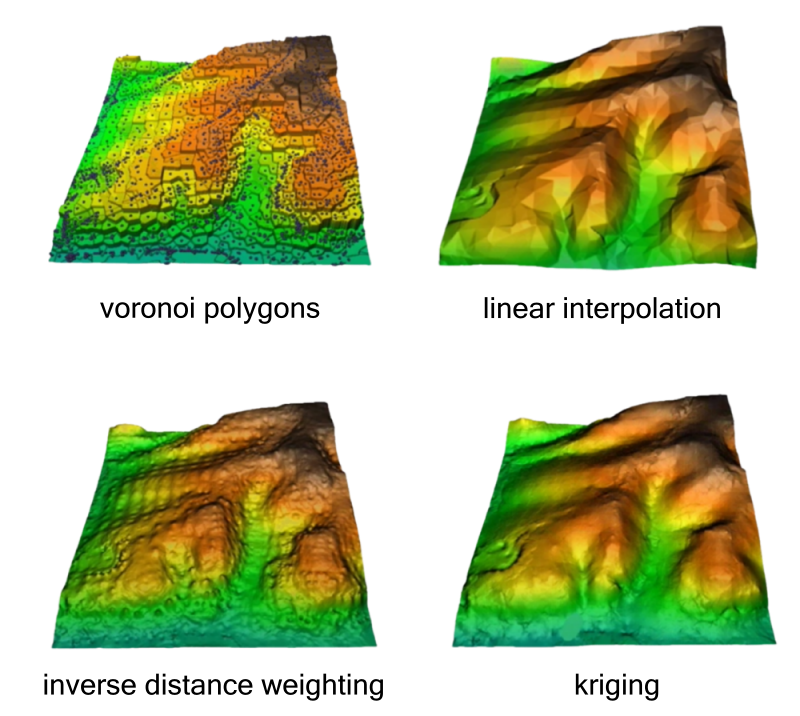
Overview of different interpolation methods for the same data points of a terrain surface

Geostatistics is a branch of statistics focusing on spatial or spatiotemporal datasets. Developed originally to predict probability distributions of ore grades for mining operations, it is currently applied in diverse disciplines including petroleum geology, hydrogeology, hydrology, meteorology, oceanography, geochemistry, geometallurgy, geography, forestry, environmental control, landscape ecology, soil science, and agriculture (esp. in precision farming). Geostatistics is applied in varied branches of geography, particularly those involving the spread of diseases (epidemiology), the practice of commerce and military planning (logistics), and the development of efficient spatial networks. Geostatistical algorithms are incorporated in many places, including geographic information systems (GIS).

== Background ==
Geostatistics is intimately related to interpolation methods but extends far beyond simple interpolation problems. Geostatistical techniques rely on statistical models based on random function (or random variable) theory to model the uncertainty associated with spatial estimation and simulation.

A number of simpler interpolation methods/algorithms, such as inverse distance weighting, bilinear interpolation and nearest-neighbor interpolation, were already well known before geostatistics. Geostatistics goes beyond the interpolation problem by considering the studied phenomenon at unknown locations as a set of correlated random variables.

Let Z(x) be the value of the variable of interest at a certain location x. This value is unknown (e.g., temperature, rainfall, piezometric level, geological facies, etc.). Although there exists a value at location x that could be measured, geostatistics considers this value as random since it was not measured or has not been measured yet. However, the randomness of Z(x) is not complete. Still, it is defined by a cumulative distribution function (CDF) that depends on certain information that is known about the value Z(x):

$$F(\mathit{z}, \mathbf{x}) = \operatorname{Prob} \lbrace Z(\mathbf{x}) \leqslant \mathit{z} \mid \text{information} \rbrace .$$

Typically, if the value of Z is known at locations close to x (or in the neighborhood of x) one can constrain the CDF of Z(x) by this neighborhood: if a high spatial continuity is assumed, Z(x) can only have values similar to the ones found in the neighborhood. Conversely, in the absence of spatial continuity Z(x) can take any value. The spatial continuity of the random variables is described by a model of spatial continuity that can be either a parametric function in the case of variogram-based geostatistics, or have a non-parametric form when using other methods such as multiple-point simulation or pseudo-genetic techniques.

By applying a single spatial model on an entire domain, one makes the assumption that Z is a stationary process. It means that the same statistical properties are applicable on the entire domain. Several geostatistical methods provide ways of relaxing this stationarity assumption.

In this framework, one can distinguish two modeling goals:

1. Estimating the value for Z(x), typically by the expectation, the median or the mode of the CDF f(z,x). This is usually denoted as an estimation problem.
2. Sampling from the entire probability density function f(z,x) by actually considering each possible outcome of it at each location. This is generally done by creating several alternative maps of Z, called realizations. Consider a domain discretized in N grid nodes (or pixels). Each realization is a sample of the complete N-dimensional joint distribution function

$$F(\mathbf{z}, \mathbf{x}) = \operatorname{Prob} \lbrace Z(\mathbf{x}_1) \leqslant z_1, Z(\mathbf{x}_2) \leqslant z_2, ..., Z(\mathbf{x}_N) \leqslant z_N \rbrace .$$

In this approach, the presence of multiple solutions to the interpolation problem is acknowledged. Each realization is considered as a possible scenario of what the real variable could be. All associated workflows are then considering ensemble of realizations, and consequently ensemble of predictions that allow for probabilistic forecasting. Therefore, geostatistics is often used to generate or update spatial models when solving inverse problems.

A number of methods exist for both geostatistical estimation and multiple realizations approaches. Several reference books provide a comprehensive overview of the discipline.

== Methods ==
=== Estimation ===
==== Kriging ====
Kriging is a group of geostatistical techniques to interpolate the value of a random field (e.g., the elevation, z, of the landscape as a function of the geographic location) at an unobserved location from observations of its value at nearby locations.

==== Bayesian estimation ====
Bayesian inference is a method of statistical inference in which Bayes' theorem is used to update a probability model as more evidence or information becomes available. Bayesian inference is playing an increasingly important role in geostatistics. Bayesian estimation implements kriging through a spatial process, most commonly a Gaussian process, and updates the process using Bayes' theorem to calculate its posterior. High-dimensional Bayesian geostatistics refers to Bayesian modeling and analysis for geostatistical data when the number of spatial locations is massive. Probabilistic machine learning methods, specifically predictive stacking, are also available for Bayesian geostatistics.

==== Finite difference method ====
Considering the principle of conservation of probability, recurrent difference equations (finite difference equations) were used in conjunction with lattices to compute probabilities quantifying uncertainty about the geological structures. This procedure is a numerical alternative method to Markov chains and Bayesian models.

=== Simulation ===
- Aggregation
- Dissagregation
- Turning bands
- Cholesky decomposition
- Truncated Gaussian
- Plurigaussian
- Annealing
- Spectral simulation
- Sequential Indicator
- Sequential Gaussian
- Dead Leave
- Transition probabilities
- Markov chain geostatistics
- Support vector machine
- Boolean simulation
- Genetic models
- Pseudo-genetic models
- Cellular automata
- Multiple-Point Geostatistics

== Definitions and tools ==
- Regionalized variable theory
- Covariance function
- Semi-variance
- Variogram
- Kriging
- Range (geostatistics)
- Sill (geostatistics)
- Nugget effect
- Training image
- Finite difference method

== See also ==
- Arbia's law of geography
- Concepts and Techniques in Modern Geography
- Multivariate interpolation
- Spline interpolation
- Geodemographic segmentation
- Geodesy
- Geographic Information Science
- Geographic Information Systems
- Geomatics
- SaTScan
- Remote sensing
- Pedometrics
- Time geography
- Tobler's first law of geography
- Tobler's second law of geography
- Uncertain geographic context problem
