= Charles M. Stein =

American statistician

- Born: March 22, 1920; Brooklyn, New York, U.S.
- Died: November 24, 2016 (aged 96); Fremont, California, U.S.
- Education: Columbia University; University of Chicago
- Scientific career
- Fields: Statistics
- Workplaces: Stanford University
- Doctoral advisor: Abraham Wald

Charles Max Stein (March 22, 1920 – November 24, 2016) was an American mathematical statistician and professor of statistics at Stanford University.

He received his Ph.D. in 1947 at Columbia University with advisor Abraham Wald. He held faculty positions at Berkeley and the University of Chicago before moving permanently to Stanford in 1953. He is known for Stein's paradox in decision theory, which shows that ordinary least squares estimates can be uniformly improved when many parameters are estimated; for Stein's lemma, giving a formula for the covariance of one random variable with the value of a function of another when the two random variables are jointly normally distributed; for the Chernoff-Stein Lemma which states that the Kullback Leibler divergence describes the optimal type II error exponent for the Neyman-Pearson setting in hypothesis testing, and for Stein's method, a way of proving theorems such as the Central Limit Theorem that does not require the variables to be independent and identically distributed. He was a member of the National Academy of Sciences. He died in November 2016 at the age of 96.

== Works ==
- Approximate Computation of Expectations, Institute of Mathematical Statistics, Hayward, CA, 1986.
- A bound for the error in the normal approximation to the distribution of a sum of dependent random variables, Sixth Berkeley Stanford Symposium, pages 583–602.

== Interviews ==
- DeGroot, Morris H. (1986). "A Conversation with Charles Stein". Statistical Science. 1 (4): 454–462. doi:10.1214/ss/1177013517. JSTOR 2245793.
- "Charles Stein: The Invariant, the Direct and the "Pretentious"" (PDF).

== See also ==
- James–Stein estimator
- Stein's lemma
- Stein's method
- Stein's unbiased risk estimate
- Stein's loss
- Stein discrepancy
