= Universal hypothesis testing =

Special setting of hypothesis testing

In statistics, universal hypothesis testing is a generalization of binary simple hypothesis testing. The universal problem is to distinguish between a simple null hypothesis $H_0: Q = P$, and the most general composite alternative $H_1: Q \neq P$, using independent and identically distributed samples from $Q$. The problem was first described in Wassily Hoeffding's work on optimal tests for multinomial distributions, which focused on the asymptotics of the problem.

The setting is sometimes referred to as goodness of fit testing or one-sample testing. It is similar in principle to the identity testing problem, in which we are promised that an unknown distribution is either exactly $P$ or $\varepsilon$-far from $P$ in some statistical distance. In certain circumstances "universal hypothesis testing" is used to refer to composite hypothesis testing problems using universal inference estimators, which are statistics that work without regularity assumptions.

== Formulation ==
A simple binary hypothesis testing problem involves distinguishing between $H_0: Q = P_0$ and $H_1: Q = P_1$, using samples $X_1, \dots, X_n \overset{\text{i.i.d.}}{\sim} Q$. In the traditional setting of hypothesis testing $P_0, P_1$ are known apriori. A composite version of this problem involves sets of probability distributions $\Omega_0, \Omega_1$, and requires distinguishing between $H_0: Q \in \Omega_0$ and $H_1: Q \in \Omega_1$. Universal hypothesis testing corresponds to the special case of composite hypothesis testing where the null hypothesis is simple, $\Omega_0 = P$ and the alternative hypothesis is the set of all distributions other than $P$, $\Omega_1 = \{F: F \neq P\}$.

Given a fixed number of samples, these two hypothesis can be indistinguishable, as it is possible for the distribution under the alternative hypothesis to be arbitrarily close to the null hypothesis. To avoid this issue, the problem is often considered in the Neyman-Pearson setting, where the goal is to build a test that achieves a fixed type I error probability under the null hypothesis and then minimize the probability of type II error. Mathematical formulations of universal hypothesis testing generally assume that under the alternative hypothesis the distribution is fixed but unknown, to highlight the fact that universal tests do not require knowledge of the alternative to function.

Subsequent work on universal hypothesis testing includes second-order asymptotic analysis, universal outlier hypothesis testing, and universal quickest change detection. Universal hypothesis testing has been studied in regimes where the support of the underlying distributions grows as a proportion to the number of samples drawn from the distribution, in what is called the 'learning limited regime'. Applications for universal hypothesis testing include universal coding. While Hoeffding's initial results were restricted to distributions with finite supports, later results developed solutions for continuous distributions using extensions of the Kullback-Leibler Divergence, or kernel methods.

=== Two-sample universal hypothesis testing ===
Another version of the universal hypothesis testing problem is the two-sample problem, in which the nominal distribution $P$ is also unknown, and all inference is made using samples from both $P$ and $Q$.

=== Gutman setting ===
The Gutman hypothesis testing problem inolves three unknown distributions, $P_1, P_2, Q$, where samples are provided from each distribution. In this setting, the hypothesis is
$$\begin{aligned}
H_0&: Q = P_1\\
H_1&: Q = P_2.
\end{aligned}$$
The samples from $P_1, P_2$ are referred to as the training samples, and the samples from $Q$ are known as the test samples. This has a natural connection to the binary classification problem in statistical learning theory.

== Examples ==
As an example, we might want to know if a particular coin was fair, i.e. $\mathbb{P}[X = H] = \frac{1}{2} = \mathbb{P}[X = T]$ or not, i.e. $\mathbb{P}[X = H] \neq \mathbb{P}[X=T]$, where $H,T$ denote the coin coming up heads or tails.

== See also ==
- Statistical hypothesis test
- Error exponents in hypothesis testing
- Kullback–Leibler divergence
- Two-sample hypothesis testing
- Student's t-test
- Nonparametric statistics
