= Louis Chen Hsiao Yun =

Singaporean statistician (born 1940)

Louis Chen Hsiao Yun (Chinese: 陈晓云; pinyin: Chen Xiaoyun; born 26 December 1940) is emeritus professor at the National University of Singapore.

Chen earned his BSc (Honours) from University of Singapore in 1964 and completed his MSc as well as PhD at Stanford University in 1969 and 1971 respectively. In 1972, he joined the mathematics department of the then University of Singapore as a lecturer. He was promoted to senior lecturer in 1977, associate professor in 1981 and professor in 1989.

== Academic career ==
Chen held several administrative appointments at the National University of Singapore (NUS). At NUS's Faculty of Science, he was head of the Department of Mathematics from July 1996 to June 2000 and head of the Department of Statistics and Applied Probability from July 2002 to June 2004. He was also director of NUS's Institute for Mathematical Sciences from July 2000 to December 2012. For his achievements in his field of study, he was appointed Tan Chin Tuan Centennial Professor from July 2006 to December 2012 and distinguished professor from January 2013 to June 2015.

== Research, honours and awards ==
Chen's research interests include the Stein-Chen method of Poisson approximation which deals with the probability of rare events. This method and technique is widely applied in many areas ranging from molecular biology to computer science.

He was the first Asian to be elected president of the Bernoulli Society for Mathematical Statistics and Probability from August 1997 to July 1999, and was the first East Asian to be elected president of the Institute of Mathematical Statistics from August 2004 to July 2005. He was also elected vice-president of the International Statistical Institute from August 2009 to July 2011. Among his numerous local and international awards and honours are his election as Fellow of TWAS, The World Academy of Sciences in 2000 and Fellow of the Singapore National Academy of Science in 2011; a Public Administration Medal (Silver) in 2002; and the conferment by the French Government of the title of Chevalier dans l'Ordre des Palmes Académiques in 2005 for his service to education.

== Selected works ==
- Chen, Louis H. Y., "Poisson approximation for dependent trials", Ann. Probability 3 (1975), no. 3, 534–545.
- Chen, Louis H. Y.; Goldstein, Larry; Shao, Qi-Man, "Normal approximation by Stein's method". Probability and its Applications (New York). Springer, Heidelberg, 2011. ISBN 978-3-642-15006-7.
- Barbour, A. D.; Chen, Louis H. Y.; Loh, Wei-Liem, "Compound Poisson approximation for nonnegative random variables via Stein's method", Ann. Probab. 20 (1992), no. 4, 1843–1866.
- Chen, Louis H. Y.; Röllin, Adrian; Xia, Aihua, “Palm theory, random measures and Stein couplings”, Ann. Appl. Probab. 31 (2021), no. 6, 2881–2923.
- Chen, Louis H. Y.; Shao, Qi-Man, "Stein's method for normal approximation". An introduction to Stein's method, 1–59, Lect. Notes Ser. Inst. Math. Sci. Natl. Univ. Singap., 4, Singapore Univ. Press, Singapore, 2005.
