= Cogstate Brief Battery =

Cognitive assessment

- Synonyms: Cogstate Schizophrenia Battery

The Cogstate Brief Battery (CBB) is a computer-based cognitive assessment used in clinical trials, healthcare, and academic research to measure neurological cognition. It was developed by Cogstate Ltd.

== Assessment ==
The 15-minute assessment consists of four cognitive and neuropsychological tests: Detection, Identification, One Card Learning, and One Back. Each test measures functions in areas such as attention, visual learning, and working memory, and is designed specifically for repeated assessment.

== Application ==
The assessment has been used to measure change in patients with mild cognitive impairment. and dementia, sports-related concussions, fatigue, and alcohol use, and schizophrenia. It can be taken by adults and children, and has minimal practice effects

In 2019, Cogstate and Eisai announced a partnership to make the test available outside the United States, for use in health care and other markets.
