= Zero bias transform =

The zero-bias transform is a transform from one probability distribution to another. The transform arises in applications of Stein's method in probability and statistics.

== Formal definition ==
The zero bias transform may be applied to both discrete and continuous random variables. Consider a random variable T with mean zero and variance σ². The zero bias transform of its density function f(t) is a new density function g(s) defined by

$$g(s) = \frac{1}{\sigma^2}\int_s^\infty tf(t)\,1(t > s)\, dt = \frac{1}{\sigma^2}\operatorname{E}[T\,1(T > s)].$$

An equivalent but alternative approach is to deduce the nature of the transformed random variable by evaluating the expected value

$$\operatorname{E}(TH(T)) = \sigma^2E(h(T^z))$$

where the right-side superscript denotes a zero biased random variable whereas the left hand side expectation represents the original random variable. Above, h is the derivative of H. An example from each approach is given in the examples section beneath.

If the random variable is discrete the integral becomes a sum from positive infinity to s. The zero bias transform is taken for a mean zero, variance 1 random variable which may require a location-scale transform to the random variable.

== Applications ==
The zero bias transformation arises in applications where a normal approximation is desired. Similar to Stein's method the zero bias transform is often applied to sums of random variables with each summand having finite variance an mean zero.

The zero bias transform has been applied to CDO tranche pricing.

== Examples ==
1. Consider a Bernoulli(p) random variable B with Pr(B = 0) = 1 − p. The zero bias transform of T = (B − p) is:

$$\begin{align}
\operatorname{E}(TH(T)) & = -p(1-p)H(-p) + (1-p)pH(1-p) \\
& = p(1-p)[H(1-p) - H(-p)] \\
& = p(1-p) \int_{-p}^{1-p}h(s) \, ds
\end{align}$$

where h is the derivative of H. From there it follows that the random variable S is a continuous uniform random variable on the support (−p, 1 − p). This example shows how the zero bias transform smooths a discrete distribution into a continuous distribution.

2. Consider the continuous uniform on the support $(-\sqrt{3}, \sqrt{3})$.

$$\int^{\sqrt 3}_s t 1(t>s)f(t)\,dt = \int^{\sqrt 3}_s \frac{t}{2\sqrt 3} \, dt = \frac{\sqrt 3} 4 - \frac{s^2}{\sqrt{3}\, 4} \text{ where } -\sqrt{3}  < s < \sqrt{3}$$

This example shows that the zero bias transform takes continuous symmetric distributions and makes them unimodular.
