= Between-group design experiment =

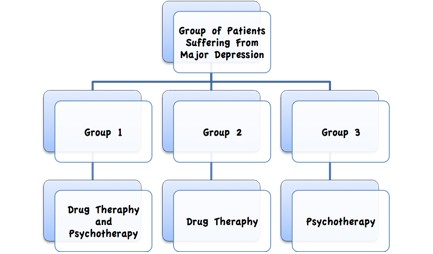
Team Portugal group study file

In the design of experiments, a between-group design is an experiment that has two or more groups of subjects each being tested by a different testing factor simultaneously. This design is usually used in place of, or in some cases in conjunction with, the within-subject design, which applies the same variations of conditions to each subject to observe the reactions. The simplest between-group design occurs with two groups; one is generally regarded as the treatment group, which receives the ‘special’ treatment (that is, it is treated with some variable), and the control group, which receives no variable treatment and is used as a reference (prove that any deviation in results from the treatment group is, indeed, a direct result of the variable). The between-group design is widely used in psychological, economic, and sociological experiments, as well as in several other fields in the natural or social sciences.

== Experimental blinds ==
In order to avoid experimental bias, experimental blinds are usually applied in between-group designs. The most commonly used type is the single blind, which keeps the subjects blind without identifying them as members of the treatment group or the control group. In a single-blind experiment, a placebo is usually offered to the control group members. Occasionally, the double blind, a more secure way to avoid bias from both the subjects and the testers, is implemented. In this case, both the subjects and the testers are unaware of which group subjects belong to. The double blind design can protect the experiment from the observer-expectancy effect.

== Advantages ==
The utilization of the between-group experimental design has several advantages. First, multiple variables, or multiple levels of a variable, can be tested simultaneously, and with enough testing subjects, a large number can be tested. Thus, the inquiry is broadened and extended beyond the effect of one variable (as with within-subject design). Additionally, this design saves a great deal of time, which is ideal if the results aid in a time-sensitive issue, such as healthcare.

== Disadvantages ==
The main disadvantage with between-group designs is that they can be complex and often require a large number of participants to generate any useful and reliable data. For example, researchers testing the effectiveness of a treatment for severe depression might need two groups of twenty patients for a control and a test group. If they wanted to add another treatment to the research, they would need another group of twenty patients. The potential scale of these experiments can make between-group designs impractical due to limited resources, subjects and space.

Another major concern for between-group designs is bias. Assignment bias, observer-expectancy and subject-expectancy biases are common causes for skewed data results in between-group experiments, which can lead to false conclusions being drawn. These problems can be prevented by implementing random assignment and creating double-blind experiments whereby both the subject and experimenter are kept blind about the hypothesized effects of the experiment.

Some other disadvantages for between-group designs are generalization, individual variability and environmental factors. Whilst it is easy to try to select subjects of the same age, gender and background, this may lead to generalization issues, as you cannot then extrapolate the results to include wider groups. At the same time, the lack of homogeneity within a group due to individual variability may also produce unreliable results and obscure genuine patterns and trends. Environmental variables can also influence results and usually arise from poor research design.

== Practice effect ==
A practice effect is the outcome/performance change resulting from repeated testing. This is best described by the Power Law of Practice: If multiple levels or some other variable variation are tested repeatedly (which is the case in between-group experiments), the subjects within each sub-group become more familiarized with testing conditions, thus increasing responsiveness and performance.

== Mixed factorial design ==
Some research has been done regarding whether it is possible to design an experiment that combines within-subject design and between-group design, or if they are distinct methods. A way to design psychological experiments using both designs exists and is sometimes known as "mixed factorial design". In this design setup, there are multiple variables, some classified as within-subject variables, and some classified as between-group variables.

One example study combined both variables. This enabled the experimenter to analyze reasons for depression among specific individuals through the within-subject variable, and also determine the effectiveness of the two treatment options through a comparison of the between-group variable:

So, for example, if we are interested in examining the effects of a new type of cognitive therapy on depression, we would give a depression pre-test to a group of persons diagnosed as clinically depressed and randomly assign them into two groups (traditional and cognitive therapy). After the patients were treated according to their assigned condition for some period of time, let’s say a month, they would be given a measure of depression again (post-test). This design would consist of one within-subject variable (test), with two levels (pre and post), and one between-subjects variable (therapy), with two levels (traditional and cognitive).

Another example tests 15 men and 15 women, and examines participants' tasting of ice cream flavors:

A group of scientists are researching to find out what flavor of ice cream people enjoy the most out of chocolate, vanilla, strawberry, and mint chocolate chip. Thirty participants were chosen to be in the experiment, half male and half female. Each participant tasted 2 spoonfuls of each flavor. They then listed the flavors in order from best tasting to least favorable. At the end of the experiment, the scientist analyzed the data both holistically and by gender. They found that vanilla was highest rated favorable among all the participants. Interestingly, they found that men prefer mint chocolate chip to plain chocolate whereas women prefer strawberry to mint chocolate chip.

The above example is between-group, as no participants can be part of both the male group and female group. It is also within-subjects, because each participant tasted all four flavors of ice cream provided.

== See also ==
- A/B testing
