= Qi-Man Shao =

Chinese probabilist and statistician

Qi-Man Shao (Chinese: 邵启满; born 1962) is a Chinese probabilist and statistician mostly known for his contributions to asymptotic theory in probability and statistics. He is currently a Chair Professor of Statistics and Data Science at the Southern University of Science and Technology in Guangdong, China.

== Biography ==
He earned a bachelor's degree in Mathematics and a master's degree in Statistics & Probability from Hangzhou University (now Zhejiang University) in 1983 and 1986, respectively. He went to graduate school at the University of Science and Technology of China and received a Ph.D. degree in Statistics & Probability in 1989. He spent four years as lecturer and then associate professor at Hangzhou University from 1986 to 1990. In July 1990, he joined Carleton University, Canada as a visiting research fellow, working with Miklós Csörgő. From September 1991 to August 1992, he worked as a Taft Postdoctoral Fellow at the University of Cincinnati. He joined the National University of Singapore as a lecturer in 1992, and later became a senior lecturer.

He joined the University of Oregon as an assistant professor in 1996, and was later promoted to associate professor and professor. From 2005 to 2012, he was a professor and Chair Professor at the Hong Kong University of Science and Technology. In 2012, he moved to the Chinese University of Hong Kong, where he served as Department Chair from 2013 to 2018 and became the Choh-Ming Li Professor of Statistics in 2015. Starting March 2019, he moved to the Southern University of Science and Technology, as a Chair Professor and the Founding Chairman of the Department of Statistics and Data Science.

His research interests include asymptotic theory in probability and statistics, self-normalized limit theory, Stein’s method, and high-dimensional and large-scale statistical analysis. He is particularly well-known for his fundamental contributions to self-normalized large and moderate deviation theories, Stein’s method for normal and non-normal approximation, and the development of various probability inequalities for dependent random variables. He authored and co-authored over 180 articles on probability and statistics, and co-authored three well-known books (Monte Carlo Methods in Bayesian Computation (2000), Self-normalized Processes: Limit Theory and Statistical Applications (2009), and Normal Approximation by Stein’s Method (2011)).

== Honors and awards ==
- Fok Ying Tung Education Foundation Award, 1989
- The State Natural Science Award (the 3rd class), 1997 (Z.Y. Lin, C.R. Lu and Q.M. Shao)
- Elected Fellow, the Institute of Mathematical Statistics, 2001
- Invited speaker (45min) at the 2010 International Congress of Mathematicians
- IMS Medallion Lecturer, Keynote Speaker at the 2011 Joint Statistical Meetings
- Plenary speaker, 36th Conference on Stochastic Processes and Their Applications, 2013
- Plenary speaker, IMS-China International Conference on Statistics and Probability, 2013
- The State Natural Science Award (the 2nd class), 2015 (Q.-M. Shao and B.-Y. Jing)

== Professional services ==
- co-Editor, The Annals of Applied Probability (1/2022 – 12/2024)
- Institute of Mathematical Statistics (IMS) Committee on Fellows, Member in 2007–2009 and 2011, Chair in 2009
- IMS Committee on Nominations (2011, 2016, 2017), Institute of Mathematical Statistics
- Council Member, Institute of Mathematical Statistics (2019–2022)
