= Universal coding =

Universal coding may refer to one of two concepts in data compression:

- Universal code (data compression), a fixed prefix code that, for any probability mass function, has a data compression ratio within a constant of the optimal prefix code
- Universal source coding, a data compression method that asymptotically approaches the data compression ratio of the optimal data compression method, e.g., LZ77 and LZ78
