= Scientific Advertising =

1923 book by Claude C. Hopkins

- Author: Claude C. Hopkins
- Language: English
- Genre: Non-fiction
- Publication date: 1923

Scientific Advertising is a book written by Claude C. Hopkins in 1923 and is cited by many advertising and marketing personalities (such as David Ogilvy, Gary Halbert, and Jay Abraham) as a "must-read" book.

== Overview ==
The book is cited as being the original description of the process of split testing and of coupon-based customer tracking and loyalty schemes.

In the book, Hopkins outlines an advertising approach based on testing and measuring. In this way losses from unsuccessful ads are kept to a safe level while gains from profitable ads are multiplied. Or, as Hopkins wrote, the advertiser is "playing on the safe side of a hundred to one shot".

The book is widely considered the foundation of direct marketing.

== Reception ==
According to Paul Feldwick, it has sold over eight million copies. David Ogilvy wrote that "Nobody should be allowed to have anything to do with advertising until he has read this book seven times. It changed the course of my life."

== In media ==
In the TV-series Mad Men, season 1 episode 11, copywriter Peggy Olson reads Scientific Advertising to prepare herself for work.

== See also ==
- Close range marketing
- Surreptitious advertising
- PVR-resistant advertising
