= Power law of practice =

Example of the learning curve effect on performance

Example graph of the power law, x axis represents time, y axis represents reaction time

The power law of practice states that the logarithm of the reaction time for a particular task decreases linearly with the logarithm of the number of practice trials taken. It is an example of the learning curve effect on performance. It was first proposed as a psychological law by Snoddy (1928), used by Crossman (1959) in his study of a cigar roller in Cuba, and played an important part in the development of Cognitive Engineering by Card, Moran, & Newell (1983). Mechanisms that would explain the power law were popularized by Fitts and Posner (1967), Newell and Rosenbloom (1981), and Anderson (1982).

However, subsequent research by Heathcote, Brown, and Mewhort suggests that the power function observed in learning curves that are averaged across participants is an artifact of aggregation. Heathcote et al. suggest that individual-level data is better fit by an exponential function and the authors demonstrate that the multiple exponential curves will average to produce a curve that is misleadingly well fit by a power function.

The power function is based on the idea that something is slowing down the learning process; at least, this is what the function suggests. Our learning does not occur at a constant rate according to this function; our learning is hindered. The exponential function shows that learning increases at a constant rate in relationship to what is left to be learned. If you know absolutely nothing about a topic, you can learn 50% of the information quickly, but when you have 50% less to learn, it takes more time to learn that final 50%.

Research by Logan suggests that the instance theory of automaticity can be used to explain why the power law is deemed an accurate portrayal of reaction time learning curves. A skill is automatic when there is one step from stimulus to retrieval. For many problem solving tasks (see table below), reaction time is related to how long it takes to discover an answer, but as time goes on, certain answers are stored within the individual's memory and they have to simply recall the information, thus reducing reaction time. This is the first theory that addresses the why of the power law of practice.

Tasks influenced by power law	How influenced
Trail-making test	Quicker response, better strategy for connecting the numbers
Match-to-sample task	Quicker response, better accuracy, pay attention to more important stimuli
Digit span	Faster response, better memory, develop better strategies with time

Power function:

RT = aP^{−b} + c

Exponential function:

RT = ae^{−b(P-1)} + c

Where

RT = trial completion time
P = trial number, starting from 1 (for exponential functions the P-1 argument is used)
a, b, and c, are constants

Practice effects are also influenced by latency. Anderson, Fincham, and Douglass looked at the relationship between practice and latency and people's ability to retain what they learned. As the time between trials increases, there is greater decay. The latency function relates to the forgetting curve.

Latency function:

latency = A + B*T^{d}

Where

A = asymptotic latency B = latency that varies T = time between introduction and testing d = decay rate

== See also ==
Portal: Psychology

- Learning curve
- Power law
- Forgetting
- Power Law
