= Claude C. Hopkins =

American advertiser and author

- Born: April 24, 1866; Hillsdale, Michigan, United States
- Died: September 1932 (aged 66); Spring Lake, Michigan, United States
- Occupations: advertising executive, author

Claude C. Hopkins (April 24, 1866 – September 1932) was an American advertising executive and author. He helped popularise the use of measurable advertising campaigns, particularly through direct mail, coupons, and comparative testing to evaluate advertising effectiveness.

== Biography ==
Claude C. Hopkins was born in Hillsdale, Michigan, on April 24, 1866. He was educated in Ludington and later attended a commercial school in Grand Rapids.

He worked for various advertising companies, including Bissell Carpet Sweeper Company, Swift & Company, and Dr. Shoop's patent medicine company. According to David Ogilvy, in 1907, at the age of 41, Hopkins was hired by Albert Lasker, owner of Lord & Thomas advertising, at a salary of $185,000 a year (equivalent to $6,392,411 in 2025). In 1907, advertising pioneer Claude C. Hopkins was hired by the Joseph Schlitz Brewing Company to revitalize their brand.

After touring the brewery and learning about their meticulous brewing process, Hopkins crafted an advertising campaign that detailed these methods, emphasizing the purity and quality of Schlitz beer. Every Beer company partook in this process, but Schiltz became the only beer company advertising that fact to the public, making them stand out against their competitors. This approach resonated with consumers and significantly boosted Schlitz's market position.

Hopkins insisted copywriters research their clients' products and produce "reason-why" copy. He believed that a good product and the atmosphere around it was often its own best salesperson, and, so he was a great believer in sampling to track the results of his advertising, and he then tested headlines, offers, and propositions against one another. He used the analysis of these measurements to improve his ad results, driving responses and the cost effectiveness of his clients' advertising.

While working for the Bissell Carpet Sweeper Company, Hopkins sent out five thousand letters recommending carpet sweepers as Christmas presents – one thousand people sent in orders. He also convinced Bissell manufacturers to offer more variety of carpet sweepers, such as making them with twelve different types of wood. Following these changes, Bissell sold two hundred fifty thousand in three weeks.

Hopkins has been credited with popularizing tooth brushing, as a result of his campaigns for Pepsodent.

His book Scientific Advertising was published in 1923, following his retirement from Lord & Thomas, where he finished his career as president and chairman. This book was followed, in 1927, by his autobiographical work My Life in Advertising. He died in September 1932 at Spring Lake.

Hopkins was inducted into the Advertising Hall of Fame in 1957.
