= Error exponents in hypothesis testing =

In statistical hypothesis testing, the error exponent of a hypothesis testing procedure is the rate at which the probabilities of Type I and Type II decay exponentially with the size of the sample used in the test. For example, if the probability of error $P_{\mathrm{error}}$ of a test decays as $e^{-n \beta}$, where $n$ is the sample size, the error exponent is $\beta$.

Formally, the error exponent of a test is defined as the limiting value of the ratio of the negative logarithm of the error probability to the sample size for large sample sizes: $\lim_{n \to \infty}\frac{-\log P_\text{error}}{n}$. Error exponents for different hypothesis tests are computed using Sanov's theorem and other results from large deviations theory. There are various methods used to show that an error exponent is achievable, including the likelihood ratio (which is known to be optimal in certain circumstances), and the empirical distribution. Error exponents are sometimes referred to as error rates, due to the connection between hypothesis testing and information theory.

== Error exponents in binary hypothesis testing ==
Consider a binary hypothesis testing problem in which observations are modeled as independent and identically distributed random variables under each hypothesis. Let $Y_1, Y_2, \ldots, Y_n$ denote the observations. Let $f_0$ denote the probability density function of each observation $Y_i$ under the null hypothesis $H_0$ and let $f_1$ denote the probability density function of each observation $Y_i$ under the alternate hypothesis $H_1$.

In this case there are two possible error events. Error of type I, also called false positive, occurs when the null hypothesis is true and it is wrongly rejected. Error of type II, also called false negative, occurs when the alternate hypothesis is true and null hypothesis is not rejected. The probability of type I error is denoted $P (\mathrm{error}\mid H_0)$ and the probability of type II error is denoted $P (\mathrm{error}\mid H_1)$. In some fields, the type I error is denoted by $\alpha_n$ and the type II error is denoted by $\beta_n$.

=== Optimal error exponent for Neyman–Pearson testing ===
In the Neyman–Pearson version of binary hypothesis testing, one is interested in minimizing the probability of type II error $P (\text{error}\mid H_1)$ subject to the constraint that the probability of type I error $P (\text{error}\mid H_0)$ is less than or equal to a pre-specified level $\alpha$. In this setting, the optimal testing procedure is a likelihood-ratio test. Furthermore, the optimal test guarantees that the type II error probability decays exponentially in the sample size $n$ according to $\lim_{n \to \infty} \frac{- \log P (\mathrm{error}\mid H_1)}{n} = D(f_0\parallel f_1)$. The error exponent $D(f_0\parallel f_1)$ is the Kullback–Leibler divergence between the probability distributions of the observations under the two hypotheses. This exponent is also referred to as the Chernoff–Stein lemma exponent.

=== Optimal error exponent for average error probability in Bayesian hypothesis testing ===
In the Bayesian version of binary hypothesis testing one is interested in minimizing the average error probability under both hypothesis, assuming a prior probability of occurrence on each hypothesis. Let $\pi_0$ denote the prior probability of hypothesis $H_0$. In this case the average error probability is given by $P_\text{ave} = \pi_0 P (\text{error}\mid H_0) + (1-\pi_0)P (\text{error}\mid H_1)$. In this setting again a likelihood ratio test is optimal and the optimal error decays as $\lim_{n \to \infty} \frac{- \log P_\text{ave} }{n} = C(f_0,f_1)$ where $C(f_0,f_1)$ represents the Chernoff-information between the two distributions defined as $C(f_0,f_1) = \max_{\lambda \in [0,1]} \left[-\log \int (f_0(x))^\lambda (f_1(x))^{(1-\lambda)} \, dx \right]$.

=== Trade-off between type I and II error ===
A more explicit tradeoff between the type I and type II error is observed when the type I error is constrained to decay exponentially, and the type II error is minimized. If we require $P(\text{error} | H_0) < e^{-n r }$ for some $r < D(f_1\| f_0)$, then the optimal type II error exponent is described by $\lim_{n \to \infty} -\frac{1}{n} \log P(\text{error} | H_1) = H_r(f_0\parallel f_1)$. Here $H(f_0\parallel f_1)$ is the Hoeffding divergence described by

$H_r(f_0 \parallel f_1) = \max_{0\leq s \leq 1} \frac{\Psi(s) - (1-s)r}{s}$ (1)

where $\Psi(s) = - \log \int dx\ f_0(x)^{1-s} f_1(x)^s$.

=== Second Order Analysis ===
Sometimes, the above considerations are described as the first order error exponents of hypothesis testing, meaning the analysis of

$\lim_{n \to \infty}-\frac{1}{n}\log \mathbb{P}_{H_1}[\text{error}]$

However, it is also possible to analyze higher order error exponents, for example the second order error exponent. If the first order error exponent is given by $I_1$, then the second order error exponent is taken to be

$-\lim_{n \to \infty}\frac{1}{ \sqrt{n} } \left( -\log \left( \mathbb{P}_{H_1}[\text{error}]\right) - nI_1\right)$

Second order analysis of hypothesis testing has been studied for several types of problems: simple hypothesis testing, One sample universal hypothesis testing, and two-sample universal problems. The second order error exponent is sometimes called the relative entropy variance.
