= Gauss–Markov =

The phrase Gauss–Markov is used in two different ways:

- Gauss–Markov processes in probability theory
- The Gauss–Markov theorem in mathematical statistics (in this theorem, one does not assume the probability distributions are Gaussian.)
