= Gauss–Markov process =

Stochastic processes

Gauss–Markov stochastic processes (named after Carl Friedrich Gauss and Andrey Markov) are stochastic processes that satisfy the requirements for both Gaussian processes and Markov processes. A stationary Gauss–Markov process is unique up to rescaling; such a process is also known as an Ornstein–Uhlenbeck process.

Gauss–Markov processes obey Langevin equations.

== Basic properties ==
Every Gauss–Markov process X(t) possesses the three following properties:

1. If h(t) is a non-zero scalar function of t, then Z(t) = h(t)X(t) is also a Gauss–Markov process
2. If f(t) is a non-decreasing scalar function of t, then Z(t) = X(f(t)) is also a Gauss–Markov process
3. If the process is non-degenerate and mean-square continuous, then there exists a non-zero scalar function h(t) and a strictly increasing scalar function f(t) such that X(t) = h(t)W(f(t)), where W(t) is the standard Wiener process.

Property (3) means that every non-degenerate mean-square continuous Gauss–Markov process can be synthesized from the standard Wiener process (SWP).

== Other properties ==
A stationary Gauss–Markov process with variance $\textbf{E}(X^{2}(t)) = \sigma^{2}$ and time constant $\beta^{-1}$ has the following properties.

- Exponential autocorrelation:
  $$\textbf{R}_{x}(\tau) = \sigma^{2}e^{-\beta |\tau|}.$$
- A power spectral density (PSD) function that has the same shape as the Cauchy distribution:
  $$\textbf{S}_{x}(j\omega) = \frac{2\sigma^{2}\beta}{\omega^{2} + \beta^{2}}.$$
  (Note that the Cauchy distribution and this spectrum differ by scale factors.)
- The above yields the following spectral factorization:
  $$\textbf{S}_{x}(s) = \frac{2\sigma^{2}\beta}{-s^{2} + \beta^{2}}
= \frac{\sqrt{2\beta}\,\sigma}{(s + \beta)}
\cdot\frac{\sqrt{2\beta}\,\sigma}{(-s + \beta)}.$$
  which is important in Wiener filtering and other areas.

There are also some trivial exceptions to all of the above.
