= Scott Ferson (professor) =

- Education: Wabash College (AB); Stony Brook University (PhD)
- Known for: p-boxes probability bounds analysis
- Scientific career
- Fields: risk and uncertainty uncertainty quantification uncertainty propagation environmental science conservation biology
- Workplaces: University of Liverpool; Stony Brook University; Applied Biomathematics
- Doctoral advisor: Lawrence Slobodkin
- Website: sites.google.com/site/scottfersonsite/

Scott David Ferson is Chair of Uncertainty in Engineering at University of Liverpool, Professor in its School of Engineering, and director of the Institute for Risk and Uncertainty there. Before joining the University of Liverpool, Ferson taught as an adjunct professor at Stony Brook University and did research at Applied Biomathematics, a small think tank on Long Island, New York. He was named a Fellow of the Society for Risk Analysis and received its Distinguished Educator Award in 2017. From Shelbyville, Indiana, Ferson received a PhD from Stony Brook University and an A.B. from Wabash College.

Ferson published several books and over 250 other scholarly publications, mostly in methods for analyzing risks and uncertainty for environmental and engineering problems. He developed the notion of the probability box and probability bounds analysis, a technique for distribution-free risk analysis or sensitivity analysis for probabilistic assessments. He authored a series of reports that have been influential in uncertainty quantification for engineering risk assessment and design problems.
