= Applications of p-boxes and probability bounds analysis =

P-boxes and probability bounds analysis have been used in many applications spanning many disciplines in engineering and environmental science, including:

- Engineering design
- Expert elicitation
- Asteroid impact probability
- Navigation in outer space
- Space debris tracking
- Sensitivity analysis in aerospace engineering of the buckling load of the frontskirt of the Ariane 5 launcher
- Fracking risks to water pollution
- Analysis of species sensitivity distributions
- ODE models of chemical reactor dynamics
- Pharmacokinetic variability of inhaled VOCs
- Groundwater modeling
- Bounding failure probability for series systems
- Heavy metal contamination in soil at an ironworks brownfield
- Uncertainty propagation for salinity risk models
- Power supply system safety assessment
- Contaminated land risk assessment
- Engineered systems for drinking water treatment
- Computing soil screening levels
- Human health and ecological risk analysis by the U.S. EPA of PCB contamination at the Housatonic River Superfund site
- Environmental assessment for the Calcasieu Estuary Superfund site
- Aerospace engineering for supersonic nozzle thrust
- Verification and validation in scientific computation for engineering problems
- Toxicity to small mammals of environmental mercury contamination
- Modeling travel time of pollution in groundwater
- Reliability analysis
- Endangered species assessment for reintroduction of Leadbeater's possum
- Exposure of insectivorous birds to an agricultural pesticide
- Climate change projections
- Waiting time in queuing systems
- Extinction risk analysis for spotted owl on the Olympic Peninsula
- Biosecurity against introduction of invasive species or agricultural pests
- Finite-element structural analysis
- Cost estimates
- Nuclear stockpile certification
