= Possibility theory =

Mathematical theory for handling uncertainty

Possibility theory is a mathematical theory for dealing with certain types of uncertainty and is an alternative to probability theory. It uses measures of possibility and necessity between 0 and 1, ranging from impossible to possible and unnecessary to necessary, respectively. Professor Lotfi Zadeh first introduced possibility theory in 1978 as an extension of his theory of fuzzy sets and fuzzy logic. Didier Dubois and Henri Prade further contributed to its development. Earlier, in the 1950s, economist G. L. S. Shackle proposed the min/max algebra to describe degrees of potential surprise.

== Formalization of possibility ==
For simplicity, assume that the universe of discourse Ω is a finite set. A possibility measure is a function $\Pi$ from $2^\Omega$ to [0, 1] such that:

Axiom 1: $\Pi(\varnothing) = 0$

Axiom 2: $\Pi(\Omega) = 1$

Axiom 3: $\Pi(U \cup V) = \max \left( \Pi(U), \Pi(V) \right)$ for any disjoint subsets $U$ and $V$.

It follows that, like probability on finite probability spaces, the possibility measure is determined by its behavior on singletons:

$$\Pi(U) = \max_{\omega \in U} \Pi (\{\omega\}).$$

Axiom 1 can be interpreted as the assumption that Ω is an exhaustive description of future states of the world, because it means that no belief weight is given to elements outside Ω.

Axiom 2 could be interpreted as the assumption that the evidence from which $\Pi$ was constructed is free of any contradiction. Technically, it implies that there is at least one element in Ω with possibility 1.

Axiom 3 corresponds to the additivity axiom in probabilities. However, there is an important practical difference. Possibility theory is computationally more convenient because Axioms 1–3 imply that:

$\Pi(U \cup V) = \max \left( \Pi(U), \Pi(V) \right)$ for any subsets $U$ and $V$.

Because one can know the possibility of the union from the possibility of each component, it can be said that possibility is compositional with respect to the union operator. Note however that it is not compositional with respect to the intersection operator. Generally:

$$\Pi(U \cap V) \leq \min \left( \Pi(U), \Pi(V) \right) \leq \max \left( \Pi(U), \Pi(V) \right).$$

When Ω is not finite, Axiom 3 can be replaced by:

For all index sets $I$, if the subsets $U_{i,\, i \in I}$ are pairwise disjoint, $\Pi\left(\bigcup_{i \in I} U_i\right) = \sup_{i \in I}\Pi(U_i).$

== Necessity ==
Whereas probability theory uses a single number, the probability, to describe how likely an event is to occur, possibility theory uses two concepts, the possibility and the necessity of the event. For any set $U$, the necessity measure is defined by

$$N(U) = 1 - \Pi(\overline U)$$.

In the above formula, $\overline U$ denotes the complement of $U$, that is the elements of $\Omega$ that do not belong to $U$. It is straightforward to show that:

$N(U) \leq \Pi(U)$ for any $U$

and that:

$$N(U \cap V) = \min ( N(U), N(V))$$.

Note that contrary to probability theory, possibility is not self-dual. That is, for any event $U$, we only have the inequality:

$$\Pi(U) + \Pi(\overline U) \geq 1$$

However, the following duality rule holds:

For any event $U$, either $\Pi(U) = 1$, or $N(U) = 0$

Accordingly, beliefs about an event can be represented by a number and a bit.

== Interpretation ==
There are four cases that can be interpreted as follows:

$N(U) = 1$ means that $U$ is necessary. $U$ is certainly true. It implies that $\Pi(U) = 1$.

$\Pi(U) = 0$ means that $U$ is impossible. $U$ is certainly false. It implies that $N(U) = 0$.

$\Pi(U) = 1$ means that $U$ is possible. I would not be surprised at all if $U$ occurs. It leaves $N(U)$ unconstrained.

$N(U) = 0$ means that $U$ is unnecessary. I would not be surprised at all if $U$ does not occur. It leaves $\Pi(U)$ unconstrained.

The intersection of the last two cases is $N(U) = 0$ and $\Pi(U) = 1$ meaning that I believe nothing at all about $U$. Because it allows for indeterminacy like this, possibility theory relates to the graduation of a many-valued logic, such as intuitionistic logic, rather than the classical two-valued logic.

Note that unlike possibility, fuzzy logic is compositional with respect to both the union and the intersection operator. The relationship with fuzzy theory can be explained with the following classic example.

- Fuzzy logic: When a bottle is half full, it can be said that the level of truth of the proposition "The bottle is full" is 0.5. The word "full" is seen as a fuzzy predicate describing the amount of liquid in the bottle.
- Possibility theory: There is one bottle, either completely full or totally empty. The proposition "the possibility level that the bottle is full is 0.5" describes a degree of belief. One way to interpret 0.5 in that proposition is to define its meaning as: I am ready to bet that it's empty as long as the odds are even (1:1) or better, and I would not bet at any rate that it's full.

== Possibility theory as an imprecise probability theory ==
There is an extensive formal correspondence between probability and possibility theories, where the addition operator corresponds to the maximum operator.

A possibility measure can be seen as a consonant plausibility measure in the Dempster–Shafer theory of evidence. The operators of possibility theory can be seen as a hyper-cautious version of the operators of the transferable belief model, a modern development of the theory of evidence.

Possibility can be seen as an upper probability: any possibility distribution defines a unique credal set of admissible probability distributions by

$$K = \{\, P \mid \forall S\ P(S)\leq \Pi(S)\,\}.$$

This allows one to study possibility theory using the tools of imprecise probabilities.

== Necessity logic ==
We call generalized possibility every function satisfying Axiom 1 and Axiom 3. We call generalized necessity the dual of a generalized possibility. The generalized necessities are related to a very simple and interesting fuzzy logic called necessity logic. In the deduction apparatus of necessity logic the logical axioms are the usual classical tautologies. Also, there is only a fuzzy inference rule extending the usual modus ponens. Such a rule says that if α and α → β are proved at degree λ and μ, respectively, then we can assert β at degree min{λ,μ}. It is easy to see that the theories of such a logic are the generalized necessities and that the completely consistent theories coincide with the necessities (see for example Gerla 2001).

== See also ==
- Fuzzy measure theory
- Logical possibility
- Modal logic
- Probabilistic logic
- Random-fuzzy variable
- Transferable belief model
- Upper and lower probabilities
