= Credal set =

Set of probability measures

In mathematics, a credal set is a set of probability distributions or, more generally, a set of (possibly only finitely additive) probability measures. A credal set is often assumed or constructed to be a closed convex set. It is intended to express uncertainty or doubt about the probability model that should be used, or to convey the beliefs of a Bayesian agent about the possible states of the world.

If a credal set $K(X)$ is closed and convex, then, by the Krein–Milman theorem, it can be equivalently described by its extreme points $\mathrm{ext}[K(X)]$. In that case, the expectation for a function $f$ of $X$ with respect to the credal set $K(X)$ forms a closed interval $[\underline{E}[f],\overline{E}[f]]$, whose lower bound is called the lower prevision of $f$, and whose upper bound is called the upper prevision of $f$:

$$\underline{E}[f]=\min_{\mu\in K(X)} \int f \, d\mu=\min_{\mu\in \mathrm{ext}[K(X)]} \int f \, d\mu$$

where $\mu$ denotes a probability measure, and with a similar expression for $\overline{E}[f]$ (just replace $\min$ by $\max$ in the above expression).

If $X$ is a categorical variable, then the credal set $K(X)$ can be considered as a set of probability mass functions over $X$. If additionally $K(X)$ is also closed and convex, then the lower prevision of a function $f$ of $X$ can be simply evaluated as:

$$\underline{E}[f]=\min_{p\in \mathrm{ext}[K(X)]} \sum_x f(x) p(x)$$

where $p$ denotes a probability mass function. It is easy to see that a credal set over a Boolean variable $X$ cannot have more than two extreme points (because the only closed convex sets in $\mathbb{R}$ are closed intervals), while credal sets over variables $X$ that can take three or more values can have any arbitrary number of extreme points.

== See also ==
- Imprecise probability
- Dempster–Shafer theory
- Probability box
- Robust Bayes analysis
- Upper and lower probabilities
