= Upper and lower probabilities =

Representations of imprecise probability

Upper and lower probabilities are representations of imprecise probability. Whereas probability theory uses a single number, the probability, to describe how likely an event is to occur, this method uses two numbers: the event's upper probability and the event's lower probability.

Because frequentist statistics disallow metaprobabilities, frequentists have had to propose new solutions. Cedric Smith and Arthur Dempster each developed a theory of upper and lower probabilities. Glenn Shafer developed Dempster's theory further, now known as Dempster–Shafer theory or Choquet (1953). More precisely, in the work of these authors, one considers in a power set, $P(S)\,\!$, a mass function $m : P(S)\rightarrow R$ satisfying the conditions

$$m(\varnothing) = 0 \,\,\,\,\,\,\! ; \,\,\,\,\,\, m(A) \ge 0 \,\,\,\,\,\,\! ; \,\,\,\,\,\, \sum_{A \in P(S)} m(A) = 1. \,\!$$

In turn, a mass is associated with two non-additive continuous measures called belief and plausibility, defined as follows:

$$\operatorname{bel}(A) = \sum_{B \mid B \subseteq A} m(B)\,\,\,\,;\,\,\,\,
\operatorname{pl}(A) = \sum_{B \mid B \cap A \ne \varnothing} m(B)$$

In the case where $S$ is infinite there can be $\operatorname{bel}$ such that there is no associated mass function. See p. 36 of Halpern (2003). Probability measures are a special case of belief functions in which the mass function only assigns positive mass to the event space's singletons.

A different notion of upper and lower probabilities is obtained by the lower and upper envelopes obtained from a class C of probability distributions by setting

$$\operatorname{env_1}(A) = \inf_{p \in C} p(A)\,\,\,\,;\,\,\,\,
\operatorname{env_2}(A) = \sup_{p \in C} p(A)$$

The upper and lower probabilities also relate to probabilistic logic: see Gerla (1994).

Observe also that a necessity measure can be seen as a lower probability, and a possibility measure as an upper probability.

== See also ==
- Possibility theory
- Fuzzy measure theory
- Interval finite element
- Probability bounds analysis
