= Teddy Seidenfeld =

American philosopher

Teddy Seidenfeld is an American statistician and philosopher currently the H. A. Simon University Professor at Carnegie Mellon University.
