= Imprecise probability =

Probability theory for low quality data

Imprecise probability generalizes probability theory to allow for partial probability specifications, and is applicable when information is scarce, vague, or conflicting, in which case a unique probability distribution may be hard to identify. Thereby, the theory aims to represent the available knowledge more accurately. Imprecision is useful for dealing with expert elicitation, because:

- People have a limited ability to determine their own subjective probabilities and might find that they can only provide an interval.
- As an interval is compatible with a range of opinions, the analysis ought to be more convincing to a range of different people.

== Introduction ==
Uncertainty is traditionally modelled by a probability distribution, as developed by Kolmogorov, Laplace, de Finetti, Ramsey, Cox, Lindley, and many others. However, this has not been unanimously accepted by scientists, statisticians, and probabilists: it has been argued that some modification or broadening of probability theory is required, because one may not always be able to provide a probability for every event, particularly when only little information or data is available—an early example of such criticism is Boole's critique of Laplace's work—, or when we wish to model probabilities that a group agrees with, rather than those of a single individual.

Perhaps the most common generalization is to replace a single probability specification with an interval specification. Lower and upper probabilities, denoted by $\underline{P}(A)$ and $\overline{P}(A)$, or more generally, lower and upper expectations (previsions), aim to fill this gap. A lower probability function is superadditive but not necessarily additive, whereas an upper probability is subadditive. To get a general understanding of the theory, consider:

- the special case with $\underline{P}(A)=\overline{P}(A)$ for all events $A$ is equivalent to a precise probability
- $\underline{P}(A)=0$ and $\overline{P}(A)=1$ for all non-trivial events represents no constraint at all on the specification of $P(A)$

We then have a flexible continuum of more or less precise models in between.

Some approaches, summarized under the name nonadditive probabilities, directly use one of these set functions, assuming the other one to be naturally defined such that $\underline{P}(A^c)= 1-\overline{P}(A)$, with $A^c$ the complement of $A$. Other related concepts understand the corresponding intervals $[\underline{P}(A), \overline{P}(A)]$ for all events as the basic entity.

== History ==
The idea to use imprecise probability has a long history. The first formal treatment dates back at least to the middle of the nineteenth century, by George Boole, who aimed to reconcile the theories of logic and probability. In the 1920s, in A Treatise on Probability, Keynes formulated and applied an explicit interval estimate approach to probability. Work on imprecise probability models proceeded fitfully throughout the 20th century, with important contributions by Bernard Koopman, C. A. B. Smith, I. J. Good, Arthur Dempster, Glenn Shafer, Peter M. Williams, Henry Kyburg, Isaac Levi, and Teddy Seidenfeld. At the start of the 1990s, the field started to gather some momentum, with the publication of Peter Walley's book Statistical Reasoning with Imprecise Probabilities (which is also where the term "imprecise probability" originates). The 1990s also saw important works by Kuznetsov, and by Weichselberger, who both use the term interval probability. Walley's theory extends the traditional subjective probability theory via buying and selling prices for gambles, whereas Weichselberger's approach generalizes Kolmogorov's axioms without imposing an interpretation.

Standard consistency conditions relate upper and lower probability assignments to non-empty closed convex sets of probability distributions. Therefore, as a welcome by-product, the theory also provides a formal framework for models used in robust statistics and non-parametric statistics. Included are also concepts based on Choquet integration, and so-called two-monotone and totally monotone capacities, which have become very popular in artificial intelligence under the name (Dempster–Shafer) belief functions. Moreover, there is a strong connection to Shafer and Vovk's notion of game-theoretic probability.

== Mathematical models ==
The term "imprecise probability" is somewhat misleading in that precision is often mistaken for accuracy, whereas an imprecise representation may be more accurate than a spuriously precise representation. In any case, the term appears to have become established in the 1990s, and covers a wide range of extensions of the theory of probability, including:

- credal sets, or sets of probability distributions
- previsions
- Random set theory
- Dempster–Shafer evidence theory
- lower and upper probabilities, or interval probabilities
- belief functions
- possibility and necessity measures
- lower and upper previsions
- comparative probability orderings
- partial preference orderings
- sets of desirable gambles
- p-boxes
- robust Bayes methods

== Interpretation of imprecise probabilities ==
A unification of many of the above-mentioned imprecise probability theories was proposed by Walley, although this is in no way the first attempt to formalize imprecise probabilities. In terms of probability interpretations, Walley's formulation of imprecise probabilities is based on the subjective variant of the Bayesian interpretation of probability. Walley defines upper and lower probabilities as special cases of upper and lower previsions and the gambling framework advanced by Bruno de Finetti. In simple terms, a decision maker's lower prevision is the highest price at which the decision maker is sure he or she would buy a gamble, and the upper prevision is the lowest price at which the decision maker is sure he or she would buy the opposite of the gamble (which is equivalent to selling the original gamble). If the upper and lower previsions are equal, then they jointly represent the decision maker's fair price for the gamble, the price at which the decision maker is willing to take either side of the gamble. The existence of a fair price leads to precise probabilities.

The allowance for imprecision, or a gap between a decision maker's upper and lower previsions, is the primary difference between precise and imprecise probability theories. This gap is also given by Henry Kyburg repeatedly for his interval probabilities, though he and Isaac Levi also give other reasons for intervals, or sets of distributions, representing states of belief.

== Issues with imprecise probabilities ==
One issue with imprecise probabilities is that there is often an independent degree of caution or boldness inherent in the use of one interval, rather than a wider or narrower one. This may be a degree of confidence, degree of fuzzy membership, or threshold of acceptance. This is not as much of a problem for intervals that are lower and upper bounds derived from a set of probability distributions, e.g., a set of priors followed by conditionalization on each member of the set. However, it can lead to the question why some distributions are included in the set of priors and some are not.

Another issue is why one can be precise about two numbers, a lower bound and an upper bound, rather than a single number, a point probability. This issue may be merely rhetorical, as the robustness of a model with intervals is inherently greater than that of a model with point-valued probabilities. It does raise concerns about inappropriate claims of precision at endpoints, as well as for point values.

A more practical issue is what kind of decision theory can make use of imprecise probabilities. For fuzzy measures, there is the work of Ronald R. Yager. For convex sets of distributions, Levi's works are instructive. Another approach asks whether the threshold controlling the boldness of the interval matters more to a decision than simply taking the average or using a Hurwicz decision rule. Other approaches appear in the literature.

== See also ==
- Ambiguity aversion
- Robust decision making
- Imprecise Dirichlet process
