= Interval boundary element method =

Interval boundary element method is classical boundary element method with the interval parameters.
Boundary element method is based on the following integral equation

$c\cdot u=\int\limits_{\partial \Omega}\left(G\frac{\partial u}{\partial n} - \frac{\partial G}{\partial n}u\right)dS$

The exact interval solution on the boundary can be defined in the following way:

$\tilde{u}(x)=\{u(x,p):c(p)\cdot u(p)=\int\limits_{\partial \Omega}\left(G(p)\frac{\partial u(p)}{\partial n} - \frac{\partial G(p)}{\partial n}u(p)\right)dS, p\in\hat{p} \}$

In practice we are interested in the smallest interval which contain the exact solution set

$\hat{u}(x)=hull \ \tilde {u}(x)=hull \{u(x,p):c(p)\cdot u(p)=\int\limits_{\partial \Omega}\left(G(p)\frac{\partial u(p)}{\partial n} - \frac{\partial G(p)}{\partial n}u(p)\right)dS, p\in\hat{p} \}$

In similar way it is possible to calculate the interval solution inside the boundary $\Omega$.

== See also ==
- Interval finite element
