= Uncertainty analysis =

Uncertainty analysis investigates the uncertainty of variables that are used in decision-making problems in which observations and models represent the knowledge base. In other words, uncertainty analysis aims to make a technical contribution to decision-making through the quantification of uncertainties in the relevant variables.

== Physical experiments ==
In physical experiments uncertainty analysis, or experimental uncertainty assessment, deals with assessing the uncertainty in a measurement. An experiment designed to determine an effect, demonstrate a law, or estimate the numerical value of a physical variable will be affected by errors due to instrumentation, methodology, presence of confounding effects and so on. Experimental uncertainty estimates are needed to assess the confidence in the results. A related field is the design of experiments.

== Mathematical modelling ==
Likewise in numerical experiments and modelling uncertainty analysis draws upon a number of techniques for determining the reliability of model predictions, accounting for various sources of uncertainty in model input and design. A related field is sensitivity analysis.

== Calibrated parameters and output ==
A calibrated parameter does not necessarily represent reality, as reality is much more complex. Any prediction has its complexities of reality that cannot be represented uniquely in the calibrated model; therefore, there is a potential error. Such errors must be accounted for when making management decisions on the basis of model outcomes.

== See also ==
- Interval finite element
- Uncertainty quantification
- Propagation of uncertainty
- Measurement uncertainty#Uncertainty evaluation

== Bibliography ==
- Etienne de Rocquigny, Nicolas, Devictor, Stefano, Tarantola (Editors), Uncertainty in Industrial Practice: A Guide to Quantitative Uncertainty Management, Wiley & Sons Publishers, 2008.
- J.C. Helton, J.D. Johnson, C.J. Salaberry, and C.B. Storlie, 2006, Survey of sampling based methods for uncertainty and sensitivity analysis. Reliability Engineering and System Safety, 91:1175–1209.
- Santner, T. J.; Williams, B. J.; Notz, W.I. Design and Analysis of Computer Experiments; Springer-Verlag, 2003.
