= Isaac Elishakoff =

Georgian Professor in the Ocean and Mechanical Engineering

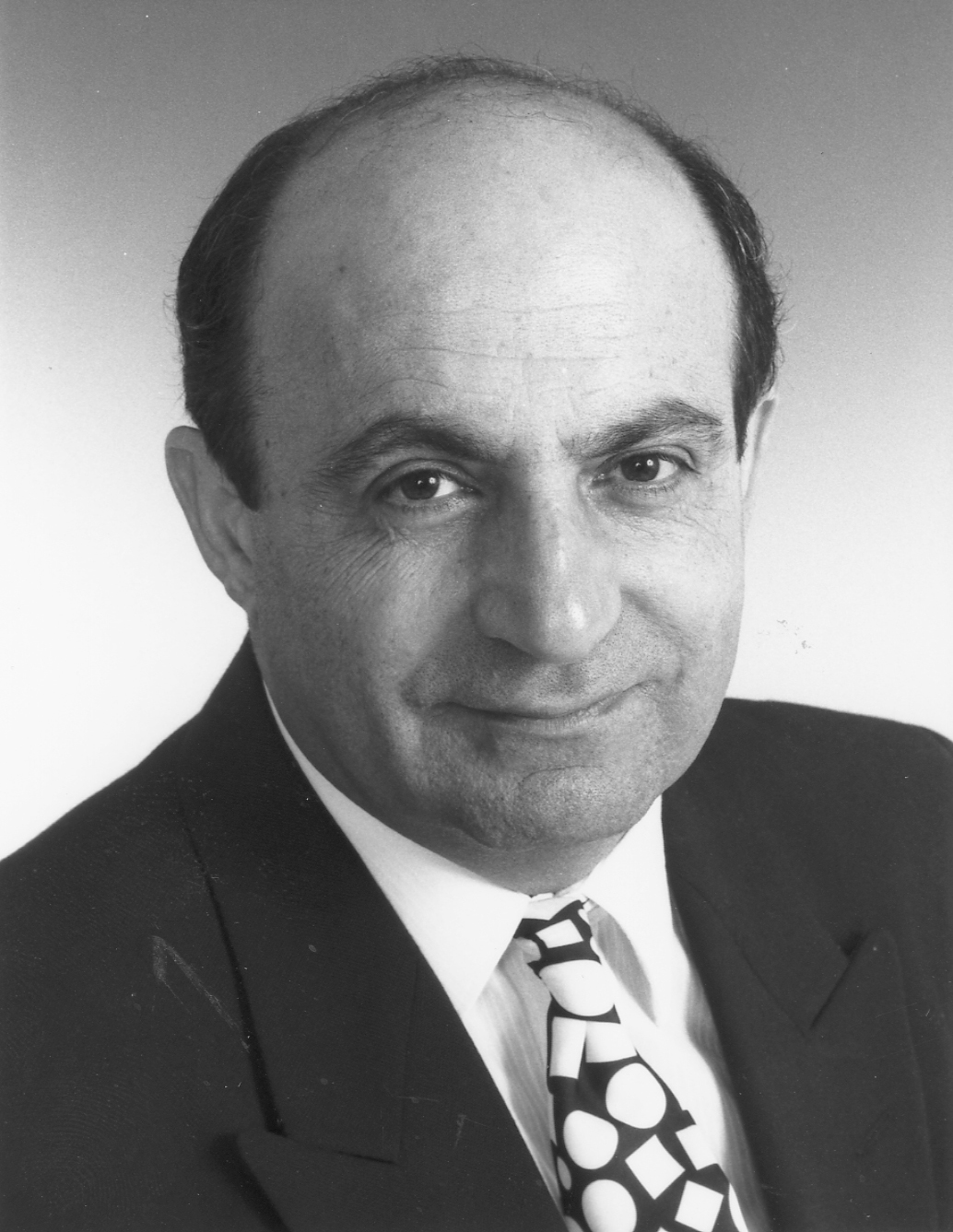
- Born: 9 February 1944 (age 82); Kutaisi, Georgian SSR, Soviet Union
- Education: Moscow Power Engineering Institute, Moscow, Russia
- Known for: Stability; Vibration; Random Vibration; Reliability; Functionally graded material structures; Nanotechnology; Uncertainty modeling
- Awards: Masanobu Shinozuka Medal, ASCE (2025); J.S. Rao Medal in Vibration Engineering (2025); PACA (FAU President's Award for Career Achievement (2023) ); Blaise Pascal Medal in Engineering; European Academy of Sciences (2021); William B. Johnson International Inter-Professional Founders Award from The Engineers' Council (2019); ASME Worcester Reed Warner Medal (2016); Baroness Batsheva de Rothschild Award (1973), Israel
- Scientific career
- Fields: Theoretical and applied mechanics
- Workplaces: Technion – Israel Institute of Technology, Delft University of Technology, University of Notre Dame, Naval Postgraduate School, Florida Atlantic University
- Doctoral advisor: Academician Vladimir V. Bolotin

Isaac Elishakoff is an Israeli-American engineer who is Distinguished Research Professor in the Ocean and Mechanical Engineering Department in the Florida Atlantic University, Boca Raton, Florida. His research lies in the areas of random vibrations, structural reliability, solid mechanics of composite materials, semi-inverse problems of vibrations and stability, functionally graded material structures, optimization and anti-optimization of structures under uncertainty, and carbon nanotubes.

He has been published extensively in Aerospace, Civil, Mechanical and Ocean engineering. He has over 650 journal papers, and has authored, co-authored, edited, or co-edited 37 books.

== Research contributions ==
His work includes fundamental advances in random vibrations, particularly for continuous and composite structures, and a generalization of Bolotin's dynamic edge-effect method for free vibration that eliminates its inherent degeneracy.

He has advanced the field of nonlinear buckling by introducing a methodology that integrates experimental measurements of shell imperfections with theoretical knockdown factors, thereby establishing the concept of imperfection sensitivity in structural design.

His contributions to structural reliability include identifying errors arising from low-order approximations and human factors. In addition, he pioneered non-probabilistic approaches to uncertainty, developing optimization and anti-optimization frameworks and integrating them with stochastic modeling.

Elishakoff has also made contributions to the dynamic stability of imperfect structures in elastic and viscoelastic settings, as well as to the random vibration and reliability of composite structures, including the authorship of a foundational monograph. He further developed an improved non-perturbative finite element method for stochastic structures and contributed to stochastic linearization and computerized symbolic algebra.

He is the author or co-author of first or uniquely comprehensive works on convex modeling of uncertainty, reliability of composite structures, acoustically excited structures, uncertain instability problems, exact solutions for inhomogeneous structures, safety factors (in English), eigenvalue problems since Leonhard Euler, optimization and anti-optimization, functionally graded materials, carbon nanotubes and nano-sensors, and Timoshenko–Ehrenfest beam theory, the latter representing the only such monograph in a century of its development; he also modified the Timoshenko-Ehrenfest equations.

In 2019, Elishakoff described differential equations of love in order to promote love of differential equations by undergraduate students. In 2021, he wrote a response to a joke about the quadratic formula by Stephen Colbert in I Am America (And So Can You!). As of May 1, 2026, these papers have been downloaded 21,086 times.

With J. N. Reddy, Elishakoff has written on solving quadratic equations without resorting to quadratic formula. He also writes educational papers

Elishakoff is interested in the history of science. He has published several articles about Stephen P. Timoshenko (1878–1972), author of numerous textbooks in applied mechanics.

== Career ==
Elishakoff was a professor of Mechnanics and later of aeronautical engineering at Technion, Israel Institute of Technology during 1972-1990 and also Frank M. Freimann Visiting Chair Professor, at the University of Notre Dame, United States in 1985/86 and Henry J. Massman Jr. Visiting Chair Professor, at the same university in 1986/87.

He became a Fellow of American Academy of Mechanics, in 1991 for outstanding achievements and pioneering contributions in random vibrations and was visiting professor, Sapienza University of Rome, Rome, Italy in 2005, 2010, 2017.

He is a Foreign Member of the Georgian National Academy of Sciences for seminal contributions to the theoretical and applied mechanics since 2010, a Member of the European Academy of Sciences and Arts since 2011 and a Fellow, ASME since 2011.

== Awards and honors ==
Elishakoff received the Worcester Reed Warner Medal from the American Society of Mechanical Engineers in 2016.; established in 1930.

In 2021, Elishakoff received the Blaise Pascal Medal in Engineering from the European Academy of Sciences, “to recognize an outstanding and demonstrated personal contribution to science and technology and the promotion of excellence in research and education.” He was simultaneously elected as a Fellow of the European Academy of Sciences.

In 2025, he was awarded the ASCE Masanobu Shinozuka Medal for "seminal contributions to random vibrations, reliability, and nonlinear buckling simulation of shells".

In 2025, he received the J.S. Rao Medal in Vibration Engineering for great contributions to vibration engineering and technologies.

In 2021, Professors Noel Challamel (University of South Brittany, France), Julius Kaplunov (University of Keele, United Kingdom) and Izuru Takewaki (Kyoto University, Japan) edited three books titled, Modern Trends in Structural and Solid Mechanics, in honor of Elishakoff.

== Selected publications ==
=== Books ===
- I. Elishakoff, Probabilistic Methods in the Theory of Structures, Wiley‑Interscience, New York, 1983, II + pp. 489; ISBN 978-981-3149-84-7.
- Yakov Ben‑Haim and I. Elishakoff, Convex Models of Uncertainty in Applied Mechanics, Elsevier Science Publishers, Amsterdam, 1990, XVII + pp. 221; ISBN 978-0444816245.
- Gabriel Cederbaum, I. Elishakoff, Jacob Aboudi and Liviu Librescu, Random Vibration and Reliability of Composite Structures, Technomic, Lancaster, 1992, XIII + pp. 191; ISBN 9780877628651.
- I. Elishakoff, Yukweng Lin and Liping Zhu, Probabilistic and Convex Modeling of Acoustically Excited Structures, Elsevier Science Publishers, Amsterdam, 1994, VIII + pp. 296; ISBN 9781483290355.
- Elishakoff, Yiwei Li and James H. Starnes Jr., Non‑Classical Problems in the Theory of Elastic Stability, Cambridge University Press, 2001, XVI +pp. 336; ISBN 0-521-78210-4.
- Elishakoff and Yongjian Ren, Large Variation Finite Element Method for Stochastic Problems, Oxford University Press, 2003, IX + pp. 260; ISBN 0-19-852631-8.
- I. Elishakoff, Safety Factors and Reliability: Friends or Foes?, Kluwer Academic Publishers, Dordrecht, 2004, X + pp. 295; ISBN 1-4020-1779-0.
- I. Elishakoff, Eigenvalues of Inhomogeneous Structures: Unusual Closed-Form Solutions of Semi-Inverse Problems, CRC Press, Boca Raton, 2005, XIV + pp. 729; ISBN 0-8493-2892-6.
- I. Elishakoff and Makoto Ohsaki, Optimization and Anti-Optimization of Structures under Uncertainty, Imperial College Press, London, 2010, XV+ pp. 402; ISBN 978-1-84816-477-2.
- I. Elishakoff, Resolution of Twentieth Century Conundrum in Elastic Stability, World Scientific/Imperial College Press, Singapore, 2014; pp. 333, ISBN 978-981-4583-53-4.
- I. Elishakoff, D. Pentaras and C. Gentilini, Mechanics of Functionally Graded Material Structures, World Scientific/Imperial College Press, Singapore; pp. 323, ISBN 978-981-4656-58-0, 2015.
- I. Elishakoff, Solution Manual to Accompany Probabilistic Methods in the Theory of Structures: Problems with Complete, Worked Through Solutions, World Scientific, Singapore, ISBN 978-981-3201-10-1, 2018.
- I. Elishakoff, Handbook on Timoshenko-Ehrenfest Beam and Uflyand-Mindlin Plate Theories, World Scientific, Singapore,ISBN 978-981-3236-51-6, 2019.
- I. Elishakoff, Dramatic Effect of Cross-Correlations in Random Vibrations of Discrete Systems, Beams, Plates, and Shells , Springer, Nature, Switzerland, ISBN 978---3-030-40394-2, 2020.
- V. Raizer and I. Elishakoff, Philosophies of Structural Safety and Reliability, Taylor & Francis, Boca Raton, Hb: 978-1-032-20930-1, 2022.
- Elishakoff I., Multifaceted Uncertainty Quantification, Berlin, Boston, De Gruyter, ISBN 978-311-135-42-17, 2024 .
- Elishakoff I., S.P. Timoshenko in Perspective, Singapore: World Scientific, 2027.
- Elishakoff I., Follower Forces in Engineering and Science: Fact or Fantasy?, Singapore: World Scientific, 2027.
- Richard Bachoo and I. Elishakoff, “Random Vibrations: Crandall’s Problem for Planar, Portal, Multi-Bay, X-Braced, and Laminated Frames,” Singapore: World Scientific, in press, 2027.

=== Edited volumes ===
- I. Elishakoff and Richard H. Lyon, (editors), Random Vibration‑Status and Recent Developments, Elsevier Science Publishers, Amsterdam, 1986, XX + pp. 565; ISBN 9780444426659.
- I. Elishakoff and Horst Irretier, (editors), Refined Dynamical Theories of Beams, Plates and Shels and their Applications, Springer Verlag, Berlin, 1987, XII + pp. 436; ISBN 9783540175735.
- I. Elishakoff, Johann Arbocz, Charles D. Babcock Jr. and Avinoam Libai, (editors), Buckling of Structures‑Theory and Experiment, Elsevier Science Publishers, Amsterdam, 1988, XX + pp. 449; ISBN 978-0444704740.
- T. Ariaratnam, Gerhart Schuëller, and I. Elishakoff, (editors), Stochastic Structural Dynamics‑Progress in Theory and Applications, Elsevier Applied Science Publishers, London, 1988, XX + pp. 375; ISBN 978-1851662111.
- Chuh Mei, Howard F. Wolfe and I. Elishakoff, (editors), Vibration and Behavior of Composite Structures, ASME Press, New York, 1989, V + pp. 73; ISBN 978-0791803974.
- Fabio Casciati, I. Elishakoff, and J. Brian Roberts, (editors), Nonlinear Structural Systems under Random Conditions, Elsevier Science Publishers, Amsterdam, 1990, pp. 386; ISBN 9780444888037.
- Ahmed K. Noor, I. Elishakoff and Greg Hulbert, (editors), Symbolic Computations and Their Impact on Mechanics, ASME Press, New York, 1990, XV + pp. 376; ISBN 978-0791805985.
- I. Elishakoff (editor), Whys and Hows in Uncertainty Modeling, Springer, Vienna, 1999, VII + pp. 393, ISBN 3-211-83155-X.
- Alexander P. Seyranian and I. Elishakoff (editors), Modern Problems of Structural Stability, Springer, Vienna, 2002, III + pp. 394, ISBN 3-211-83697-7.
- I. Elishakoff (editor), Mechanical Vibration: Where Do We Stand, Springer, Vienna, 2007, IV + pp. 488, ISBN 3-211-68586-3.
- I. Elishakoff and C. Soize (editors), Non-Deterministic Mechanics, Springer, Vienna, 2012, II+ pp. 356, ISBN 978-3-7091-1305-9.
