= Prediction interval =

Estimate of an interval in which future observations will fall

In statistical inference, specifically predictive inference, a prediction interval is an estimate of an interval in which a future observation will fall, with a certain probability, given what has already been observed. Prediction intervals are often used in regression analysis.

A simple example is given by a six-sided dice with face values ranging from 1 to 6. The confidence interval for the estimated expected value of the face value will be around 3.5 and will become narrower with a larger sample size. However, the prediction interval for the next roll will approximately range from 1 to 6, even with any number of sampling points seen so far.

Prediction intervals are used in both frequentist statistics and Bayesian statistics: a prediction interval bears the same relationship to a future observation that a frequentist confidence interval or Bayesian credible interval bears to an unobservable population parameter: prediction intervals predict the distribution of individual future points, whereas confidence intervals and credible intervals of parameters predict the distribution of estimates of the true population mean or other quantity of interest that cannot be observed.

== Introduction ==
If one makes the parametric assumption that the underlying distribution is a normal distribution, and has a sample set {X_{1}, ..., X_{n}}, then confidence intervals and credible intervals may be used to estimate the population mean μ and population standard deviation σ of the underlying population, while prediction intervals may be used to estimate the value of the next sample variable, X_{n+1}.

Alternatively, in Bayesian terms, a prediction interval can be described as a credible interval for the variable itself, rather than for a parameter of the distribution thereof.

The concept of prediction intervals need not be restricted to inference about a single future sample value but can be extended to more complicated cases. For example, in the context of river flooding where analyses are often based on annual values of the largest flow within the year, there may be interest in making inferences about the largest flood likely to be experienced within the next 50 years.

Since prediction intervals are only concerned with past and future observations, rather than unobservable population parameters, they are advocated as a better method than confidence intervals by some statisticians, such as Seymour Geisser, following the focus on observables by Bruno de Finetti.

== Normal distribution ==
Given a sample from a normal distribution, whose parameters are unknown, it is possible to give prediction intervals in the frequentist sense, i.e., an interval [a, b] based on statistics of the sample such that on repeated experiments, X_{n+1} falls in the interval the desired percentage of the time; one may call these "predictive confidence intervals".

A general technique of frequentist prediction intervals is to find and compute a pivotal quantity of the observables X_{1}, ..., X_{n}, X_{n+1} – meaning a function of observables and parameters whose probability distribution does not depend on the parameters – that can be inverted to give a probability of the future observation X_{n+1} falling in some interval computed in terms of the observed values so far, $X_1,\dots,X_n.$ Such a pivotal quantity, depending only on observables, is called an ancillary statistic. The usual method of constructing pivotal quantities is to take the difference of two variables that depend on location, so that location cancels out, and then take the ratio of two variables that depend on scale, so that scale cancels out. The most familiar pivotal quantity is the Student's t-statistic, which can be derived by this method and is used in the sequel.

=== Known mean, known variance ===
A prediction interval [ℓ,u] for a future observation X in a normal distribution N(μ,σ^{2}) with known mean and variance may be calculated from

$$\gamma=P(\ell<X<u)=P\left(\frac{\ell-\mu} \sigma < \frac{X-\mu} \sigma < \frac{u-\mu} \sigma \right)=P\left(\frac{\ell-\mu} \sigma < Z < \frac{u-\mu} \sigma \right),$$

where $Z=\frac{X-\mu}{\sigma}$, the standard score of X, is distributed as standard normal.

Hence

$$\frac{\ell-\mu} \sigma = -z, \quad \frac{u-\mu} \sigma = z,$$

or

$$\ell=\mu-z\sigma, \quad u=\mu+z\sigma,$$

with z the quantile in the standard normal distribution for which:

$$\gamma=P(-z<Z<z).$$

or equivalently;

$$\tfrac 12(1-\gamma)=P(Z>z).$$

Prediction interval	z
75%	1.15
90%	1.64
95%	1.96
99%	2.58

Prediction interval (on the y-axis) given from z (the quantile of the standard score, on the x-axis). The y-axis is logarithmically compressed (but the values on it are not modified).

The prediction interval is conventionally written as:

$$\left[\mu- z\sigma,\  \mu + z\sigma \right].$$

For example, to calculate the 95% prediction interval for a normal distribution with a mean (μ) of 5 and a standard deviation (σ) of 1, then z is approximately 2. Therefore, the lower limit of the prediction interval is approximately 5 ‒ (2⋅1) = 3, and the upper limit is approximately 5 + (2⋅1) = 7, thus giving a prediction interval of approximately 3 to 7.

Diagram showing the cumulative distribution function for the normal distribution with mean (μ) 0 and variance (σ^{2}) 1. In addition to the quantile function, the prediction interval for any standard score can be calculated by (1 − (1 − Φ_{μ,σ^{2}}(standard score))⋅2). For example, a standard score of x = 1.96 gives Φ_{μ,σ^{2}}(1.96) = 0.9750 corresponding to a prediction interval of (1 − (1 − 0.9750)⋅2) = 0.9500 = 95%.

=== Estimation of parameters ===
For a distribution with unknown parameters, a direct approach to prediction is to estimate the parameters and then use the associated quantile function – for example, one could use the sample mean $\overline{x}$ as an estimate for μ and the sample variance s^{2} as an estimate for σ^{2}. There are two natural choices for s^{2} here – dividing by $(n-1)$ yields an unbiased estimate, while dividing by n yields the maximum likelihood estimator, and either might be used. One then uses the quantile function with these estimated parameters $\Phi^{-1}_{\overline{x},s^2}$ to estimate an interval in the sampling distribution of $X_{n+1}$.

This approach is usable, but the resulting interval will not have the repeated sampling performance promise to cover the future observable – it is not a prediction interval.

For the sequel, use the sample mean:

$$\overline{X} = (X_1+\cdots+X_n)/n$$

and the (unbiased) sample variance:

$$S^2 = {1 \over n-1}\sum_{i=1}^n (X_i-\overline{X})^2$$

==== Unknown mean, known variance ====
Given a normal distribution with unknown mean μ but known variance $\sigma^2$, the sample mean $\overline{X}$ of the observations $X_1,\dots,X_n$ has distribution $N(\mu,\sigma^2/n),$ while the future observation $X_{n+1}$ has distribution $N(\mu,\sigma^2).$ Taking the difference of these cancels the μ and yields a normal distribution of variance $\sigma^2+(\sigma^2/n),$ thus

$$\frac{X_{n+1}-\overline{X}}{\sqrt{\sigma^2+(\sigma^2/n)}} \sim N(0,1).$$

Pivoting this quantity for $X_{n+1}$ yields the two-sided equal-tailed $100(1-\alpha)%$ prediction interval $\bar{x} \pm z_{1-\alpha/2}\sqrt{\sigma^2+\sigma^2/n }$ . This is a prediction interval in the sense that, on repeated applications of this computation, the prediction interval will cover the future observation $100(1-\alpha)%$ of the time.

Notice that this prediction interval is wider compared to simply using the known variance $\sigma^2$. This is necessary for the desired prediction interval property to hold.

Note that some authors may informally refer to $N(\overline{x},\sigma^2+(\sigma^2/n))$ as a predictive or prediction distribution for $X_{n+1}$, but taken literally this would suggest that $X_{n+1}$ follows a normal distribution centered at $\bar{x}$ with variance $\sigma^2+(\sigma^2/n)$, counter to the premise where $X_{n+1} \sim N(\mu, \sigma^2) \perp \bar{X} \sim N(\mu,\sigma^2/n)$ .

==== Known mean, unknown variance ====
Conversely, given a normal distribution with known mean μ but unknown variance $\sigma^2$, the sample variance $S^2$ of the observations $X_1,\dots,X_n$ has, up to scale, a $\chi_{n-1}^2$ distribution; more precisely:

$$\frac{(n-1)S^2}{\sigma^2} \sim \chi_{n-1}^2.$$

On the other hand, the future observation $X_{n+1}$ has distribution $N(\mu,\sigma^2).$ Taking the ratio of the future observation residual $X_{n+1}-\mu$ and the sample standard deviation S produces a pivotal quantity which follows a Student's t-distribution with n – 1 degrees of freedom (see its derivation):

$$\frac{X_{n+1}-\mu} S \sim T_{n-1}.$$

Pivoting this quantity for $X_{n+1}$ yields the two-sided equal-tailed $100(1-\alpha)%$ prediction interval $\mu \pm t_{1-\alpha/2, n-1}\cdot s$, where $t_{1-\alpha/2,n-1}$ is the $100(1-\alpha/2)^{th}$ percentile of Student's t-distribution with n − 1 degrees of freedom.

Notice that this prediction interval is more conservative than using a normal distribution with the estimated standard deviation $s$ and known mean μ, as it uses the t-distribution instead of the normal distribution, hence yields wider intervals. This is necessary for the desired prediction interval property to hold.

==== Unknown mean, unknown variance ====
Combining the above for a normal distribution $N(\mu,\sigma^2)$ with both μ and σ^{2} unknown yields the following ancillary statistic:

$$\frac{X_{n+1}-\overline{X}}{\sqrt{S+S/n}} \sim T_{n-1}$$

This simple combination is possible because the sample mean and sample variance of the normal distribution are independent statistics; this is only true for the normal distribution, and in fact characterizes the normal distribution.

Pivoting for $X_{n+1}$ yields the two-sided equal-tailed $100(1-\alpha)%$ prediction interval

$$\bar{x} \pm t_{1-\alpha/2,n-1}\sqrt{s^2+s^2/n }$$

The probability of the prediction interval covering $X_{n+1}$ is then:

$$\Pr\left(\overline{X}-t_{1-\alpha/2,n-1} \sqrt{S+S/n}\leq X_{n+1}   \leq\overline{X}+t_{1-\alpha/2,n-1} \sqrt{S+S/n}\,\right)=1-\alpha$$

where $t_{1-\alpha/2,n-1}$ is the $100(1-\alpha/2)^{th}$ percentile of Student's t-distribution with n − 1 degrees of freedom.

== Non-parametric methods ==
One can compute prediction intervals without any assumptions on the population, i.e. in a non-parametric way.

The residual bootstrap method can be used for constructing non-parametric prediction intervals.

=== Conformal Prediction ===
In general the conformal prediction method is more general. Let us look at the special case of using the minimum and maximum as boundaries for a prediction interval: If one has a sample of identical random variables {X_{1}, ..., X_{n}}, then the probability that the next observation X_{n+1} will be the largest is 1/(n + 1), since all observations have equal probability of being the maximum. In the same way, the probability that X_{n+1} will be the smallest is 1/(n + 1). The other (n − 1)/(n + 1) of the time, X_{n+1} falls between the sample maximum and sample minimum of the sample {X_{1}, ..., X_{n}}. Thus, denoting the sample maximum and minimum by M and m, this yields an (n − 1)/(n + 1) prediction interval of [m, M].

Notice that while this gives the probability that a future observation will fall in a range, it does not give any estimate as to where in a segment it will fall – notably, if it falls outside the range of observed values, it may be far outside the range. See extreme value theory for further discussion. Formally, this applies not just to sampling from a population, but to any exchangeable sequence of random variables, not necessarily independent or identically distributed.

== Contrast with other intervals ==
=== Contrast with confidence intervals ===
In the formula for the predictive confidence interval no mention is made of the unobservable parameters μ and σ of population mean and standard deviation – the observed sample statistics $\overline{X}_n$ and $S_n$ of sample mean and standard deviation are used, and what is estimated is the outcome of future samples.

When considering prediction intervals, rather than using sample statistics as estimators of population parameters and applying confidence intervals to these estimates, one considers "the next sample" $X_{n+1}$ as itself a statistic, and computes its sampling distribution.

In parameter confidence intervals, one estimates population parameters; if one wishes to interpret this as prediction of the next sample, one models "the next sample" as a draw from this estimated population, using the (estimated) population distribution. By contrast, in predictive confidence intervals, one uses the sampling distribution of (a statistic of) a sample of n or n + 1 observations from such a population, and the population distribution is not directly used, though the assumption about its form (though not the values of its parameters) is used in computing the sampling distribution.

== In regression analysis ==
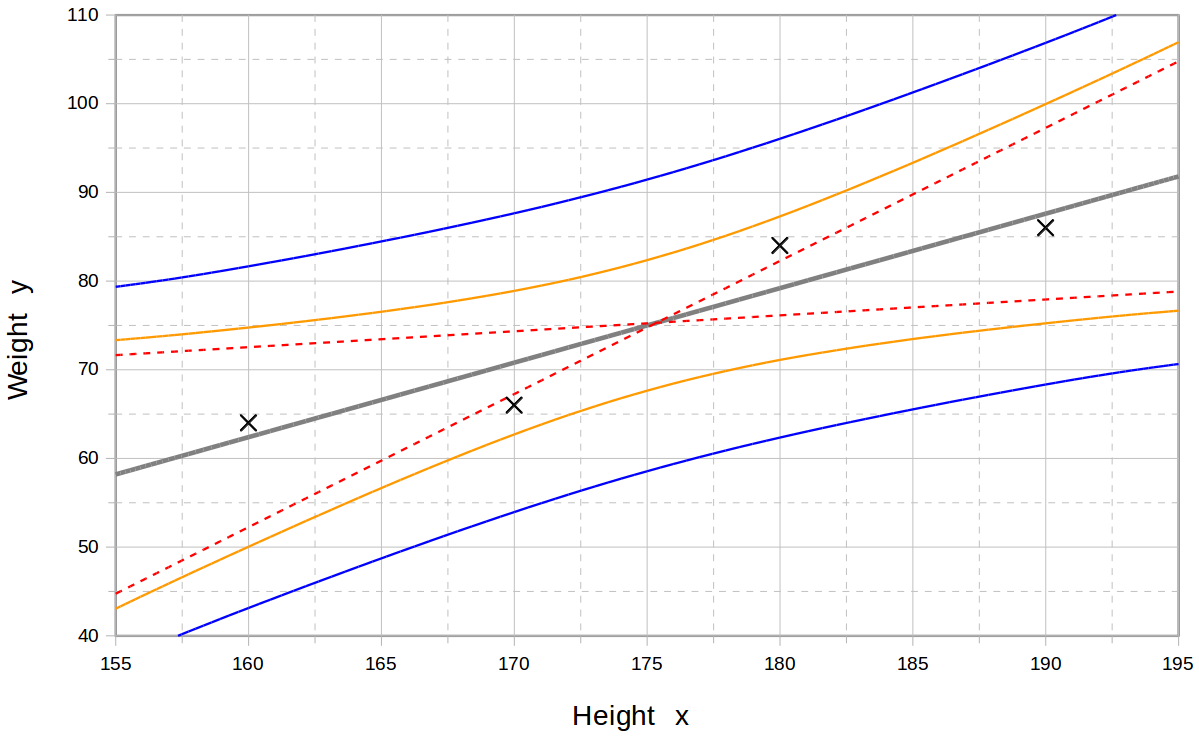
In the middle, the fitted straight line represents the best balance between the points above and below this line. The dotted straight lines represent the two extreme lines, considering only the variation in the slope. The inner curves represent the estimated range of values considering the variation in both slope and intercept. The outer curves represent a prediction for a new measurement.

A common application of prediction intervals is to regression analysis. Suppose the data is being modeled by a straight line (simple linear regression):

$$y_i=\alpha+\beta x_i +\varepsilon_i\,$$

where $y_i$ is the response variable, $x_i$ is the explanatory variable, ε_{i} is a random error term, and $\alpha$ and $\beta$ are parameters.

Given estimates $\hat \alpha$ and $\hat \beta$ for the parameters, such as from a ordinary least squares, the predicted response value y_{d} for a given explanatory value x_{d} is

$$\hat{y}_d=\hat\alpha+\hat\beta x_d ,$$

(the point on the regression line), while the actual response would be

$$y_d=\alpha+\beta x_d +\varepsilon_d.  \,$$

The point estimate $\hat{y}_d$ is called the mean response, and is an estimate of the expected value of y_{d}, $E(y\mid x_d).$

A prediction interval instead gives an interval in which one expects y_{d} to fall; this is not necessary if the actual parameters α and β are known (together with the error term ε_{i}), but if one is estimating from a sample, then one may use the standard error of the estimates for the intercept and slope ($\hat\alpha$ and $\hat\beta$), as well as their correlation, to compute a prediction interval.

So, in regression there is a distinction between intervals for predictions of the mean response and intervals for predictions of a future value—affecting essentially the inclusion or not of the unity term within the square root in the expansion factors above.

The variance for the prediction of a future value $y_d$ given $x_d$ is the same as variance of the predicted residual $y_d-\hat{y_d}$ (not to be confused with the variance of an observed residual $y_i-\hat{y_i}$). So, in multiple linear regression, the variance for the prediction of a future value $\sigma^2=\operatorname{Var}(y_d)$ is

$$\operatorname{Var}(y_d-\hat{y_d})=\sigma^2(1+x^T_d(X^TX)^{-1}x_d)$$

While the variance for the prediction of the mean response would be

$$\operatorname{Var}(\hat{y_d})=\sigma^2(x^T_d(X^TX)^{-1}x_d)$$

The first one will be always greater than the second, as the two terms below are uncorrelated:

$$\operatorname{Var}(y_d-\hat{y_d})=\operatorname{Var}(y_d) + \operatorname{Var}(\hat{y_d})$$

Finally, the variance of an observed residual will be:

$$\operatorname{Var}(y_i-\hat{y_i})=\operatorname{Var}(y_i) - \operatorname{Var}(\hat{y_i})$$

In a simple linear regression (only one predictor) the formulas become, respectively:

$$\operatorname{Var}(y_d-\hat{y_d})=\sigma^2\biggl(1+{\frac{1}{n}+\frac{(x_d-\bar{x})^2}{\displaystyle\textstyle\sum_{i=1}^n(x_i-\bar{x})^2}}\biggl)$$

and

$$\operatorname{Var}(\hat{y_d})=\sigma^2\biggl({\frac{1}{n}+\frac{(x_d-\bar{x})^2}{\displaystyle\textstyle\sum_{i=1}^n(x_i-\bar{x})^2}}\biggl)$$

Where $n$ is the number of data points. Both depend on the standard errors of the estimated parameters $\hat\alpha$ and $\hat\beta$, but in the first one we also have to consider the effect of $\operatorname{Var}(y_d)$ on the location of the individual future value around the line.

If $n\longrightarrow+\infty$, then $\operatorname{Var}(\hat{y_d})\longrightarrow0$ because it's the variance of an estimator, while $\operatorname{Var}(y_d-\hat{y_d})\longrightarrow\sigma^2$, the sample variance. They both increase when $x_d$ is far from $\bar{x}$.

Finally, the prediction interval for a single future value is

$$\hat{y_d}\pm t_{1-\alpha/2,n-2}s(y_d-\hat{y_d})$$,

and for the mean response is

$$\hat{y_d}\pm t_{1-\alpha/2,n-2}s(\hat{y_d})$$

where

$$s(y_d-\hat{y_d})=\sqrt{\operatorname{Var}(y_d-\hat{y_d})}$$,
$$s(\hat{y_d})=\sqrt{\operatorname{Var}(\hat{y_d})}$$

The factor $t_{1-\alpha/2,n-2}$ follows from the $100(1-\alpha/2)^{th}$percentile of the Student's t-distribution with $n-2$ degrees of freedom.

== Bayesian statistics ==
Seymour Geisser, a proponent of predictive inference, gives predictive applications of Bayesian statistics.

In Bayesian statistics, one can compute (Bayesian) prediction intervals from the posterior probability of the random variable, as a credible interval. In theoretical work, credible intervals are not often calculated for the prediction of future events, but for inference of parameters – i.e., credible intervals of a parameter, not for the outcomes of the variable itself. However, particularly where applications are concerned with possible extreme values of yet to be observed cases, credible intervals for such values can be of practical importance.

== Applications ==
Prediction intervals are commonly used as definitions of reference ranges, such as reference ranges for blood tests to give an idea of whether a blood test is normal or not. For this purpose, the most commonly used prediction interval is the 95% prediction interval, and a reference range based on it can be called a standard reference range.

== Multivariate ==
A prediction region is a multivariate generalization of a prediction interval, analogous to a confidence region.

== See also ==
- Extrapolation
- Posterior probability
- Prediction
- Prediction band
- Seymour Geisser
- Statistical model validation
- Trend estimation
