= Line fitting =

Line fitting is the process of constructing a straight line that has the best fit to a series of data points. Several methods exist, considering:

- Vertical distance: Simple linear regression
- Resistance to outliers: Robust simple linear regression
- Perpendicular distance: Orthogonal regression (this is not scale-invariant i.e. changing the measurement units leads to a different line.)
- Weighted geometric distance: Deming regression
- Scale invariant approach: Major axis regression This allows for measurement error in both variables, and gives an equivalent equation if the measurement units are altered.

== See also ==
- Linear least squares
- Linear segmented regression
- Linear trend estimation
- Polynomial regression
- Regression dilution
