= Commonality analysis =

Statistical technique

Commonality analysis is a statistical technique within multiple linear regression that decomposes a model's R^{2} statistic (i.e., explained variance) by all independent variables on a dependent variable in a multiple linear regression model into commonality coefficients. These coefficients are variance components that are uniquely explained by each independent variable (i.e., unique effects), (Note: Commonality coefficients for the unique effects of the predictors are also known as uniqueness coefficients. The uniqueness coefficient of a given independent variable is equal to the square of the semipartial correlation of that independent variable with the dependent variable.) and variance components that are shared in each possible combination of the independent variables (i.e., common effects). These commonality coefficients sum up to the total variance explained (model R^{2}) of all the independent variables on the dependent variable. Commonality analysis produces 2^{k} − 1 commonality coefficients, where k is the number of the independent variables.

== Example ==
As an illustrative example, in the case of three independent variables (A, B, and C), commonality returns 7 (2^{3} − 1) coefficients:

- The unique contributions of A, B, and C (three coefficients)
- The contribution common to each possible pair of variables (AB, BC, AC)
- The contribution common to all three variables (ABC)

The unique coefficient indicates to which degree the variable is independently associated with the dependent variable. Positive commonality coefficients indicate that a part of the explained variance of the dependent variable is shared between independent variables. Negative commonality coefficients indicate that there is a suppressor effects between independent variables.

== Calculation ==
The calculation of commonality coefficients can be done in principle with any software that calculates R^{2} (e.g., in SPSS; see Commonality Analysis: Demonstration of an SPSS Solution for Regression Analysis), however, this becomes quickly burdensome as number of independent variable increases. For example, with 10 independent variables, there are 2^{10} − 1 = 1023 commonality coefficients to be calculated. The yhat package in R can be used to calculate commonality coefficients, and to produce bootstrapped confidence intervals for commonality coefficients.
