= Confidence distribution =

Concept in statistics

In statistical inference, the concept of a confidence distribution (CD) has often been loosely referred to as a distribution function on the parameter space that can represent confidence intervals of all levels for a parameter of interest. Historically, it has typically been constructed by inverting the upper limits of lower sided confidence intervals of all levels. It was also commonly associated with a fiducial interpretation (fiducial distribution), although it is a purely frequentist concept. A confidence distribution is not a probability distribution function of the parameter of interest, but may still be a function useful for making inferences.

In recent years, there has been a surge of renewed interest in confidence distributions. In the more recent developments, the concept of confidence distribution has emerged as a purely frequentist concept, without any fiducial interpretation or reasoning. Conceptually, a confidence distribution is no different from a point estimator or an interval estimator (confidence interval), but it uses a sample-dependent distribution function on the parameter space (instead of a point or an interval) to estimate the parameter of interest.

A simple example of a confidence distribution, that has been broadly used in statistical practice, is a bootstrap distribution. The development and interpretation of a bootstrap distribution does not involve any fiducial reasoning; the same is true for the concept of a confidence distribution. But the notion of confidence distribution is much broader than that of a bootstrap distribution. In particular, recent research suggests that it encompasses and unifies a wide range of examples, from regular parametric cases (including most examples of the classical development of Fisher's fiducial distribution) to bootstrap distributions, p-value functions, normalized likelihood functions and, in some cases, Bayesian priors and Bayesian posteriors.

Just as a Bayesian posterior distribution contains a wealth of information for any type of Bayesian inference, a confidence distribution contains a wealth of information for constructing almost all types of frequentist inferences, including point estimates, confidence intervals, critical values, statistical power and p-values, among others. Some recent developments have highlighted the promising potentials of the CD concept, as an effective inferential tool.

== History ==
Neyman (1937) introduced the idea of "confidence" in his seminal paper on confidence intervals which clarified the frequentist repetition property. According to Fraser, the seed (idea) of confidence distribution can even be traced back to Bayes (1763) and Fisher (1930). Although the phrase seems to first be used in Cox (1958). Some researchers view the confidence distribution as "the Neymanian interpretation of Fisher's fiducial distributions", which was "furiously disputed by Fisher". It is also believed that these "unproductive disputes" and Fisher's "stubborn insistence" might be the reason that the concept of confidence distribution has been long misconstrued as a fiducial concept and not been fully developed under the frequentist framework. Indeed, the confidence distribution is a purely frequentist concept with a purely frequentist interpretation, although it also has ties to Bayesian and fiducial inference concepts.

== Definition ==
=== Classical definition ===
Classically, a confidence distribution is defined by inverting the upper limits of a series of lower-sided confidence intervals. In particular,

For every α in (0, 1), let (−∞, ξ_{n}(α)] be a 100α% lower-side confidence interval for θ, where ξ_{n}(α) = ξ_{n}(X_{n},α) is continuous and increasing in α for each sample X_{n}. Then, H_{n}(•) = ξ_{n}^{−1}(•) is a confidence distribution for θ.

Efron stated that this distribution "assigns probability 0.05 to θ lying between the upper endpoints of the 0.90 and 0.95 confidence interval, etc." and "it has powerful intuitive appeal". In the classical literature, the confidence distribution function is interpreted as a distribution function of the parameter θ, which is impossible unless fiducial reasoning is involved since, in a frequentist setting, the parameters are fixed and nonrandom.

To interpret the CD function entirely from a frequentist viewpoint and not interpret it as a distribution function of a (fixed/nonrandom) parameter is one of the major departures of recent development relative to the classical approach. The nice thing about treating confidence distributions as a purely frequentist concept (similar to a point estimator) is that it is now free from those restrictive, if not controversial, constraints set forth by Fisher on fiducial distributions.

=== The modern definition ===
The following definition applies; Θ is the parameter space of the unknown parameter of interest θ, and χ is the sample space corresponding to data X_{n}={X_{1}, ..., X_{n}}:

A function H_{n}(•) = H_{n}(X_{n}, •) on χ × Θ → [0, 1] is called a confidence distribution (CD) for a parameter θ, if it follows two requirements:
- (R1) For each given X_{n} ∈ χ, H_{n}(•) = H_{n}(X_{n}, •) is a continuous cumulative distribution function on Θ;
- (R2) At the true parameter value θ = θ_{0}, H_{n}(θ_{0}) ≡ H_{n}(X_{n}, θ_{0}), as a function of the sample X_{n}, follows the uniform distribution U[0, 1].

Also, the function H is an asymptotic CD (aCD), if the U[0, 1] requirement is true only asymptotically and the continuity requirement on H_{n}(•) is dropped.

In nontechnical terms, a confidence distribution is a function of both the parameter and the random sample, with two requirements. The first requirement (R1) simply requires that a CD should be a distribution on the parameter space. The second requirement (R2) sets a restriction on the function so that inferences (point estimators, confidence intervals and hypothesis testing, etc.) based on the confidence distribution have desired frequentist properties. This is similar to the restrictions in point estimation to ensure certain desired properties, such as unbiasedness, consistency, efficiency, etc.

A confidence distribution derived by inverting the upper limits of confidence intervals (classical definition) also satisfies the requirements in the above definition and this version of the definition is consistent with the classical definition.

Unlike the classical fiducial inference, more than one confidence distributions may be available to estimate a parameter under any specific setting. Also, unlike the classical fiducial inference, optimality is not a part of requirement. Depending on the setting and the criterion used, sometimes there is a unique "best" (in terms of optimality) confidence distribution. But sometimes there is no optimal confidence distribution available or, in some extreme cases, we may not even be able to find a meaningful confidence distribution. This is not different from the practice of point estimation.

=== A definition with measurable spaces ===
A confidence distribution $C$ for a parameter $\gamma$ in a measurable space is a distribution estimator with $C(A_p) = p$ for a family of confidence regions $A_p$ for $\gamma$ with level $p$ for all levels $0 < p < 1$. The family of confidence regions is not unique. If $A_p$ only exists for $p \in I \subset (0,1)$, then $C$ is a confidence distribution with level set $I$. Both $C$ and all $A_p$ are measurable functions of the data. This implies that $C$ is a random measure and $A_p$ is a random set. If the defining requirement $P(\gamma \in A_p) \ge p$ holds with equality, then the confidence distribution is by definition exact. If, additionally, $\gamma$ is a real parameter, then the measure theoretic definition coincides with the above classical definition.

== Examples ==
=== Example 1: Normal mean and variance ===
Suppose a normal sample X_{i} ~ N(μ, σ^{2}), i = 1, 2, ..., n is given.

==== Known Variance σ^{2} ====
Let, Φ be the cumulative distribution function of the standard normal distribution, and $F_{t_{n-1}}$ the cumulative distribution function of the Student $t_{n-1}$ distribution. Both the functions $H_\mathit{\Phi}(\mu)$ and $H_t(\mu)$ given by

$$H_\Phi(\mu) = \mathit{\Phi}{\left(\frac{\sqrt{n}(\mu-\bar{X})}{\sigma}\right)} ,
\quad\text{and}\quad
H_t(\mu) = F_{t_{n-1}}{\left(\frac{\sqrt{n}(\mu-\bar{X})}{s}\right)} ,$$

satisfy the two requirements in the CD definition, and they are confidence distribution functions for μ. Furthermore,

$$H_A(\mu) = \mathit{\Phi}{\left(\frac{\sqrt{n}(\mu-\bar{X})}{s}\right)}$$

satisfies the definition of an asymptotic confidence distribution when n→∞, and it is an asymptotic confidence distribution for μ. The uses of $H_{t}(\mu)$ and $H_{A}(\mu)$ are equivalent to state that we use $N(\bar{X},\sigma^2)$ and $N(\bar{X},s^2)$ to estimate $\mu$, respectively.

==== Unknown variance ====
For the parameter μ, since $H_\mathit{\Phi}(\mu)$ involves the unknown parameter σ and it violates the two requirements in the CD definition, it is no longer a "distribution estimator" or a confidence distribution for μ. However, $H_{t}(\mu)$ is still a CD for μ and $H_{A}(\mu)$ is an aCD for μ.

For the parameter σ^{2}, the sample-dependent cumulative distribution function

$$H_{\chi^2}(\theta) = 1 - F_{\chi^2_{n-1}}{\left((n-1)s^2/\theta\right)}$$

is a confidence distribution function for σ^{2}. Here, $F_{\chi^2_{n-1}}$ is the cumulative distribution function of the $\chi^2_{n-1}$ distribution .

In the case when the variance σ^{2} is known, $H_{\mathit{\Phi}}(\mu) = \mathit{\Phi} \left(\frac{\sqrt{n}}{\sigma}(\mu-\bar{X})\right)$ is optimal in terms of producing the shortest confidence intervals at any given level. In the case when the variance σ^{2} is unknown, $H_{t}(\mu) = F_{t_{n-1}}\left(\frac{\sqrt{n}}{s}(\mu-\bar{X})\right)$ is an optimal confidence distribution for μ.

=== Example 2: Bivariate normal correlation ===
Let ρ denotes the correlation coefficient of a bivariate normal population. It is well known that Fisher's z defined by the Fisher transformation:

$$z = \frac{1}{2}\ln{1+r \over 1-r}$$

has the limiting distribution $N{\left({1 \over 2}\ln{{1+\rho}\over{1-\rho}}, {1 \over n-3}\right)}$ with a fast rate of convergence, where r is the sample correlation and n is the sample size.

The function

$$H_n(\rho) = 1 - \mathit{\Phi}\left(\sqrt{n-3} \left({1 \over 2}\ln{1+r \over 1-r} -{1 \over 2}\ln{{1+\rho}\over{1-\rho}} \right)\right)$$

is an asymptotic confidence distribution for ρ.

An exact confidence density for ρ is

$$\pi (\rho \mid r) =
\frac{\nu (\nu - 1)\Gamma(\nu-1)}{\sqrt{2\pi}\Gamma(\nu + \frac{1}{2})}
\left(1 - r^2\right)^{\frac{\nu - 1}{2}} \cdot
\left(1 - \rho^2\right)^{\frac{\nu - 2}{2}} \cdot
\left(1 - r \rho\right)^{-\nu+\frac{1}{2}}
F{\left(\frac{3}{2},-\frac{1}{2}; \nu + \frac{1}{2}; \frac{1 + r \rho}{2}\right)}$$

where $F$ is the Gaussian hypergeometric function and $\nu = n-1 > 1$ . This is also the posterior density of a Bayes matching prior for the five parameters in the binormal distribution.

The very last formula in the classical book by Fisher gives

$$\pi (\rho | r) =
\frac{(1 - r^2)^{\frac{\nu - 1}{2}} \cdot
(1 - \rho^2)^{\frac{\nu - 2}{2}}}{\pi (\nu - 2)!}
\partial_{\rho r}^{\nu - 2}
\left\{
\frac{\theta - \frac{1}{2}\sin 2\theta}{\sin^3 \theta}
\right\}$$

where $\cos \theta = -\rho r$ and $0 < \theta < \pi$. This formula was derived by C. R. Rao.

=== Example 3: Binormal mean ===
Let data be generated by $Y = \gamma + U$ where $\gamma$ is an unknown vector in the plane and $U$ has a binormal and known distribution in the plane. The distribution of $\Gamma^y = y - U$ defines a confidence distribution for $\gamma$. The confidence regions $A_p$ can be chosen as the interior of ellipses centered at $\gamma$ and axes given by the eigenvectors of the covariance matrix of $\Gamma^y$. The confidence distribution is in this case binormal with mean $\gamma$, and the confidence regions can be chosen in many other ways. The confidence distribution coincides in this case with the Bayesian posterior using the right Haar prior. The argument generalizes to the case of an unknown mean $\gamma$ in an infinite-dimensional Hilbert space, but in this case the confidence distribution is not a Bayesian posterior.

== Using confidence distributions for inference ==
=== Confidence interval ===

From the CD definition, it is evident that the interval $(-\infty, H_n^{-1}(1-\alpha)], [H_n^{-1}(\alpha), \infty)$ and $[H_n^{-1}(\alpha/2), H_n^{-1}(1-\alpha/2)]$ provide 100(1 − α)%-level confidence intervals of different kinds, for θ, for any α ∈ (0, 1). Also $[H_n^{-1}(\alpha_1), H_n^{-1}(1-\alpha_2)]$ is a level 100(1 − α_{1} − α_{2})% confidence interval for the parameter θ for any α_{1} > 0, α_{2} > 0 and α_{1} + α_{2} < 1. Here, $H_n^{-1}(\beta)$ is the 100β% quantile of $H_n(\theta)$ or it solves for θ in equation $H_n(\theta)=\beta$. The same holds for a CD, where the confidence level is achieved in limit. Some authors have proposed using them for graphically viewing what parameter values are consistent with the data, instead of coverage or performance purposes.

=== Point estimation ===
Point estimators can also be constructed given a confidence distribution estimator for the parameter of interest. For example, given H_{n}(θ) the CD for a parameter θ, natural choices of point estimators include the median M_{n} = H_{n}^{−1}(1/2), the mean $\bar{\theta}_n = \int_{-\infty}^\infty t \, \mathrm{d}H_n(t)$, and the maximum point of the CD density

$$\widehat{\theta}_n=\arg\max_\theta h_n(\theta), h_n(\theta)=H'_n(\theta).$$

Under some modest conditions, among other properties, one can prove that these point estimators are all consistent. Certain confidence distributions can give optimal frequentist estimators.

=== Hypothesis testing ===
One can derive a p-value for a test, either one-sided or two-sided, concerning the parameter θ, from its confidence distribution H_{n}(θ). Denote by the probability mass of a set C under the confidence distribution function $p_s(C) = H_n(C) = \int_C \mathrm{d} H(\theta).$ This p_{s}(C) is called "support" in the CD inference and also known as "belief" in the fiducial literature. We have

1. For the one-sided test K_{0}: θ ∈ C vs. K_{1}: θ ∈ C^{c}, where C is of the type of (−∞, b] or [b, ∞), one can show from the CD definition that sup_{θ ∈ C}P_{θ}(p_{s}(C) ≤ α) = α. Thus, p_{s}(C) = H_{n}(C) is the corresponding p-value of the test.
2. For the singleton test K_{0}: θ = b vs. K_{1}: θ ≠ b, P_{{K_{0}: θ = b}}(2 min{p_{s}(C_{lo}), one can show from the CD definition that p_{s}(C_{up})} ≤ α) = α. Thus, 2 min{p_{s}(C_{lo}), p_{s}(C_{up})} = 2 min{H_{n}(b), 1 − H_{n}(b)} is the corresponding p-value of the test. Here, C_{lo} = (−∞, b] and C_{up} = [b, ∞).

See Figure 1 from Xie and Singh (2011) for a graphical illustration of the CD inference.

== Implementations ==
A few statistical programs have implemented the ability to construct and graph confidence distributions.

- R, via the concurve, pvaluefunctions, and episheet packages
- Excel, via episheet
- Stata, via concurve

== See also ==
- Coverage probability

== Bibliography ==
- Xie, M. and Singh, K. (2013). "Confidence Distribution, the Frequentist Distribution Estimator of a Parameter: A Review". International Statistical Review, 81, 3–39.
- Schweder, T and Hjort, N L (2016). Confidence, Likelihood, Probability: Statistical Inference with Confidence Distributions. London: Cambridge University Press. ISBN 9781139046671
- Fisher, R A (1956). Statistical Methods and Scientific Inference. New York: Hafner. ISBN 0-02-844740-9.
- Fisher, R. A. (1955). "Statistical methods and scientific induction" J. Roy. Statist. Soc. Ser. B. 17, 69—78. (criticism of statistical theories of Jerzy Neyman and Abraham Wald from a fiducial perspective)
- Hannig, J. (2009). "On generalized fiducial inference". Statistica Sinica, 19, 491–544.
- Lawless, F. and Fredette, M. (2005). "Frequentist prediction intervals and predictive distributions." Biometrika. 92(3) 529–542.
- Lehmann, E.L. (1993). "The Fisher, Neyman–Pearson theories of testing hypotheses: one theory or two?" Journal of the American Statistical Association 88 1242–1249.
- Neyman, Jerzy (1956). "Note on an Article by Sir Ronald Fisher". Journal of the Royal Statistical Society. Series B (Methodological) 18 (2): 288–294. JSTOR 2983716. (reply to Fisher 1955, which diagnoses a fallacy of "fiducial inference")
- Schweder T., Sadykova D., Rugh D. and Koski W. (2010) "Population Estimates From Aerial Photographic Surveys of Naturally and Variably Marked Bowhead Whales" Journal of Agricultural Biological and Environmental Statistics 2010 15: 1–19
- Bityukov S., Krasnikov N., Nadarajah S. and Smirnova V. (2010) "Confidence distributions in statistical inference". AIP Conference Proceedings, 1305, 346-353.
- Singh, K. and Xie, M. (2012). "CD-posterior --- combining prior and data through confidence distributions." Contemporary Developments in Bayesian Analysis and Statistical Decision Theory: A Festschrift for William E. Strawderman. (D. Fourdrinier, et al., Eds.). IMS Collection, Volume 8, 200 -214.
