= Linear regression (disambiguation) =

Linear regression includes any approach to modelling a predictive relationship for one set of variables based on another set of variables, in such a way that unknown parameters appear linearly.

Linear regression may also refer to:

- The ordinary least squares method, one of the most popular methods for estimating a linear regression model for a univariate predictand
- Weighted least squares, used for fitting linear regression with heteroscedastic errors
- Generalized least squares, used for fitting linear regression with correlated and/or heteroscedastic errors
- Simple linear regression, the simplest type of regression, involving only one explanatory variable
- General linear model for multivariate predictands
- Generalised linear model for non-normal distributions
- Bayesian linear regression, where statistical analysis is from a Bayesian viewpoint
- Bayesian multivariate linear regression, for Bayesian analysis of multiple predictands

== See also ==
- Line regression
