= Gauss–Markov theorem =

Theorem related to ordinary least squares

In statistics, the Gauss–Markov theorem (or simply Gauss theorem) states that, under certain conditions, the ordinary least squares (OLS) estimator for linear regression has the lowest sampling variance among all linear unbiased estimators. In practical terms, the theorem guarantees that among those estimators, OLS yields regression coefficient estimates that vary the least across samples. This means OLS is the best linear unbiased estimator (BLUE). The conditions for the theorem are that the model errors are each mean zero, have finite equal variances, and are all mutually uncorrelated. The errors need not be normal, nor independent and identically distributed.

This theorem holds only for unbiased estimators, since there exist biased estimators with lower variance. See, for example, ridge regression or the James–Stein estimator (which is a nonlinear biased estimator).

The theorem is named after Carl Friedrich Gauss and Andrey Markov, although Gauss's work significantly predates Markov's. Gauss derived the result under the stronger assumptions of independence and normality, but Markov later showed the same result under the more relaxed modern assumptions. Alexander Aitken further extended the result to non-spherical errors (correlated errors or those with unequal variances), for which generalized least squares (GLS) is BLUE.

== Statement ==
The theorem is stated here in three parts: the model, the assumptions, and the conclusion that OLS is BLUE, whose terms are defined in reverse order (estimator, unbiased, linear, best).

=== Model ===
Suppose we have, in matrix notation, the linear relationship
$$y = X \beta + \varepsilon,\quad
(y, \varepsilon \in \mathbb{R}^n, \beta \in \mathbb{R}^K \text{ and }
X \in \mathbb{R}^{n\times K}),$$
where $\beta_j$ are non-random but unobservable parameters, $X_{ij}$ are non-random and observable (called the "explanatory variables"), $\varepsilon_i$ are random, and so $y_i$ are random. The random variables $\varepsilon_i$ are called the "disturbance", "noise" or simply "error" (will be contrasted with "residual" later in the article; see errors and residuals in statistics).

=== Assumptions ===
The Gauss–Markov assumptions are:

- Linear: The model is linear in the parameters $\beta$, as in the relationship above.
- Uncorrelated: Distinct error terms are uncorrelated: $\operatorname{Cov}(\varepsilon_i, \varepsilon_j) = 0, \forall i \neq j.$
- Mean zero: The errors have mean zero: $\operatorname{E}[\varepsilon_i] = 0.$
- Homoscedastic: The errors are homoscedastic, that is, all have the same finite variance: $\operatorname{Var}(\varepsilon_i) = \sigma^2 < \infty$ for all $i$.
- Full rank: The matrix $X$ has full column rank, so that $X^\mathsf{T} X$ is invertible.

The first four are weaker than the LINE conditions (linearity, independence, normality, equal variance) often taught for regression inference: the errors need not be independent or normal.

=== Definitions ===
==== Estimator ====
The ordinary least squares estimator (OLS) is the function
$$\widehat\beta = (X^\mathsf{T} X)^{-1} X^\mathsf{T} y$$
of $y$ and $X$ (where $X^\mathsf{T}$ denotes the transpose of $X$) that minimizes the sum of squares of residuals (misprediction amounts):
$$\sum_{i=1}^n (y_i - \hat y_i)^2 =
\sum_{i=1}^n \left(y_i - \sum_{j=1}^K \hat\beta_j X_{ij}\right)^2.$$

For a proof that this estimator minimizes rather than maximizes the sum of squared residuals, see Proofs involving ordinary least squares.

==== Unbiased ====
The estimator is said to be unbiased if and only if
$$\operatorname{E}[\hat\beta_j] = \beta_j$$
regardless of the values of $X_{ij}$.

==== Linear ====
A linear estimator of $\beta_j$ is a linear combination
$$\widehat\beta_j = c_{1j} y_1 + \cdots + c_{nj} y_n,$$
in which the coefficients $c_{ij}$ are not allowed to depend on the underlying coefficients $\beta_j$, since those are not observable, but are allowed to depend on the values $X_{ij}$, since these data are observable.

==== Best ====
Now, let $\sum_{j=1}^K \lambda_j\beta_j$ be some linear combination of the coefficients. Then the mean squared error of the corresponding estimation is
$$\operatorname{E} \left[ \left( \sum_{j=1}^K \lambda_j (\hat\beta_j - \beta_j) \right)^2 \right],$$
in other words, it is the expectation of the square of the weighted sum (across parameters) of the differences between the estimators and the corresponding parameters to be estimated. (Since we are considering the case in which all the parameter estimates are unbiased, this mean squared error is the same as the variance of the linear combination.)

The best linear unbiased estimator (BLUE) of the vector $\beta$ of parameters $\beta_j$ is one with the smallest mean squared error for every vector $\lambda$ of linear combination parameters. This is equivalent to the condition that
$$\operatorname{Var}(\tilde\beta) - \operatorname{Var}(\hat\beta)$$
is a positive semi-definite matrix for every other linear unbiased estimator $\widetilde\beta$.

=== Theorem ===
The theorem now states that the OLS estimator is a best linear unbiased estimator (BLUE).

The main idea of the proof is that the least-squares estimator is uncorrelated with every linear unbiased estimator of zero, i.e., with every linear combination $a_1 y_1 + \cdots + a_n y_n$ whose coefficients do not depend upon the unobservable $\beta$ but whose expected value is always zero.

== Proof ==
Let $\tilde\beta = Cy$ be another linear estimator of $\beta$ with $C = (X^\operatorname{T}X)^{-1}X^\operatorname{T} + D$ where $D$ is a $K \times n$ non-zero matrix. As we're restricting to unbiased estimators, minimum mean squared error implies minimum variance. The goal is therefore to show that such an estimator has a variance no smaller than that of $\widehat\beta,$ the OLS estimator. We calculate:

$$\begin{align}
\operatorname{E} \left[ \tilde\beta \right] &= \operatorname{E}[Cy] \\
&= \operatorname{E} \left [\left ((X^\operatorname{T}X)^{-1}X^\operatorname{T} + D \right )(X\beta + \varepsilon) \right ]\\
&= \left ((X^\operatorname{T}X)^{-1}X^\operatorname{T} + D \right )X\beta    + \left ((X^\operatorname{T}X)^{-1}X^\operatorname{T} + D \right ) \operatorname{E}[\varepsilon] \\
&= \left ((X^\operatorname{T}X)^{-1}X^\operatorname{T} + D \right )X\beta  && \operatorname{E}[\varepsilon] =0 \\
&= (X^\operatorname{T}X)^{-1}X^\operatorname{T}X\beta + DX\beta  \\
&= (I_K + DX)\beta. \\
\end{align}$$

Therefore, since $\beta$ is unobservable, $\tilde\beta$ is unbiased if and only if $DX = 0$. Then:

$$\begin{align}
\operatorname{Var}\left(\tilde\beta\right) &=  \operatorname{Var}(Cy) \\
&= C \text{ Var}(y)C^\operatorname{T} \\
&= \sigma^2 CC^\operatorname{T} \\
&= \sigma^2 \left ((X^\operatorname{T}X)^{-1}X^\operatorname{T} + D \right ) \left (X(X^\operatorname{T}X)^{-1} + D^\operatorname{T} \right ) \\
&= \sigma^2 \left ((X^\operatorname{T}X)^{-1}X^\operatorname{T}X(X^\operatorname{T}X)^{-1} + (X^\operatorname{T}X)^{-1}X^\operatorname{T}D^\operatorname{T} + DX(X^\operatorname{T}X)^{-1} + DD^\operatorname{T} \right) \\
&= \sigma^2(X^\operatorname{T}X)^{-1} + \sigma^2(X^\operatorname{T}X)^{-1} (DX)^\operatorname{T} + \sigma^2 DX  (X^\operatorname{T}X)^{-1} + \sigma^2DD^\operatorname{T} \\
&= \sigma^2(X^\operatorname{T}X)^{-1}+ \sigma^2DD^\operatorname{T} && DX =0 \\
&=  \operatorname{Var}\left(\widehat\beta\right)  + \sigma^2DD^\operatorname{T}  && \sigma^2(X^\operatorname{T}X)^{-1} =   \operatorname{Var}\left(\widehat\beta\right)
\end{align}$$

Since $DD^\operatorname{T}$ is a positive semidefinite matrix, $\operatorname{Var}\left( \tilde \beta \right)$ exceeds $\operatorname{Var}\left(\widehat\beta\right)$ by a positive semidefinite matrix.

=== Remarks on the proof ===
As it has been stated before, the condition of $\operatorname{Var} \left( \tilde \beta \right)- \operatorname{Var} \left(\widehat\beta\right)$ is a positive semidefinite matrix is equivalent to the property that the best linear unbiased estimator of $\ell^\operatorname{T}\beta$ is $\ell^\operatorname{T}\widehat\beta$ (best in the sense that it has minimum variance). To see this, let $\ell^\operatorname{T}\tilde\beta$ another linear unbiased estimator of $\ell^\operatorname{T}\beta$.

$$\begin{align}
\operatorname{Var}\left(\ell^\operatorname{T}\tilde\beta\right) &= \ell^\operatorname{T} \operatorname{Var} \left(\tilde\beta\right) \ell \\
&=\sigma^2 \ell^\operatorname{T} (X^\operatorname{T}X)^{-1}\ell+\ell^\operatorname{T}DD^\operatorname{T}\ell \\
&= \operatorname{Var}\left(\ell^\operatorname{T}\widehat\beta\right)+(D^\operatorname{T}\ell)^\operatorname{T}(D^\operatorname{T}\ell) \\
&\geq \operatorname{Var}\left(\ell^\operatorname{T}\widehat\beta\right)
\end{align}$$

Moreover, equality holds if and only if $D^\operatorname{T}\ell=0$. We calculate

$$\begin{align}
\ell^\operatorname{T}\tilde\beta &= \ell^\operatorname{T} \left (((X^\operatorname{T}X)^{-1}X^\operatorname{T} + D) Y \right ) && \text{ from above}\\
&= \ell^\operatorname{T}(X^\operatorname{T}X)^{-1}X^\operatorname{T}Y + \ell^\operatorname{T}DY \\
&= \ell^\operatorname{T}\widehat\beta +(D^\operatorname{T}\ell)^\operatorname{T} Y \\
&=\ell^\operatorname{T}\widehat\beta && D^\operatorname{T}\ell = 0
\end{align}$$

This proves that the equality holds if and only if $\ell^\operatorname{T}\tilde\beta=\ell^\operatorname{T}\widehat\beta$ which gives the uniqueness of the OLS estimator as a BLUE.

== Generalized least squares estimator ==
The generalized least squares (GLS), developed by Aitken, extends the Gauss–Markov theorem to the case where the error vector has a non-scalar covariance matrix. The Aitken estimator is also a BLUE.

== Gauss–Markov theorem as stated in econometrics ==
In most treatments of OLS, the regressors (parameters of interest) in the design matrix $\mathbf{X}$ are assumed to be fixed in repeated samples. This assumption is considered inappropriate for a predominantly nonexperimental science like econometrics. Instead, the assumptions of the Gauss–Markov theorem are stated conditional on $\mathbf{X}$.

=== Linearity ===
The dependent variable is assumed to be a linear function of the variables specified in the model. The specification must be linear in its parameters. This does not mean that there must be a linear relationship between the independent and dependent variables. The independent variables can take non-linear forms as long as the parameters are linear. The equation $y = \beta_{0} + \beta_{1} x^2,$ qualifies as linear while $y = \beta_{0} + \beta_{1}^2 x$ can be transformed to be linear by replacing $\beta_{1}^2$ by another parameter, say $\gamma$. An equation with a parameter dependent on an independent variable does not qualify as linear, for example $y = \beta_{0} + \beta_{1}(x) \cdot x$, where $\beta_{1}(x)$ is a function of $x$.

Data transformations are often used to convert an equation into a linear form. For example, the Cobb–Douglas function—often used in economics—is nonlinear:

$$Y = A L^\alpha K^{1 - \alpha} e^\varepsilon$$

But it can be expressed in linear form by taking the natural logarithm of both sides:

$$\ln Y=\ln A + \alpha \ln L + (1 - \alpha) \ln K + \varepsilon = \beta_0 + \beta_1 \ln L + \beta_2 \ln K + \varepsilon$$

This assumption also covers specification issues: assuming that the proper functional form has been selected and there are no omitted variables.

One should be aware, however, that the parameters that minimize the residuals of the transformed equation do not necessarily minimize the residuals of the original equation.

=== Strict exogeneity ===
For all $n$ observations, the expectation—conditional on the regressors—of the error term is zero:

$$\operatorname{E}[\,\varepsilon_{i}\mid \mathbf{X} ] = \operatorname{E}[\,\varepsilon_{i}\mid \mathbf{x}_{1}, \dots, \mathbf{x}_{n} ] = 0.$$

where
$$\mathbf{x}_i = \begin{bmatrix} x_{i1} & x_{i2} & \cdots & x_{ik} \end{bmatrix}^{\operatorname{T}}$$
is the data vector of regressors for the ith observation, and consequently
$$\mathbf{X} = \begin{bmatrix} \mathbf{x}_{1}^{\operatorname{T}} & \mathbf{x}_{2}^{\operatorname{T}} & \cdots & \mathbf{x}_{n}^{\operatorname{T}} \end{bmatrix}^{\operatorname{T}}$$
is the data matrix or design matrix.

Geometrically, this assumption implies that $\mathbf{x}_{i}$ and $\varepsilon_{i}$ are orthogonal to each other, so that their inner product (i.e., their cross moment) is zero.

$$\operatorname{E}[\,\mathbf{x}_{j} \cdot \varepsilon_{i}\,] = \begin{bmatrix} \operatorname{E}[\,{x}_{j1} \cdot \varepsilon_{i}\,] \\ \operatorname{E}[\,{x}_{j2} \cdot \varepsilon_{i}\,] \\ \vdots \\ \operatorname{E}[\,{x}_{jk} \cdot \varepsilon_{i}\,] \end{bmatrix} = \mathbf{0} \quad \text{for all } i, j \in n$$

This assumption is violated if the explanatory variables are measured with error, or are endogenous. Endogeneity can be the result of simultaneity, where causality flows back and forth between both the dependent and independent variable. Instrumental variable techniques are commonly used to address this problem.

=== Full rank ===
The sample data matrix $\mathbf{X}$ must have full column rank.

$$\operatorname{rank}(\mathbf{X}) = k$$

Otherwise $\mathbf{X}^\operatorname{T} \mathbf{X}$ is not invertible and the OLS estimator cannot be computed.

A violation of this assumption is perfect multicollinearity, i.e. some explanatory variables are linearly dependent. One scenario in which this will occur is called "dummy variable trap," when a base dummy variable is not omitted resulting in perfect correlation between the dummy variables and the constant term.

Multicollinearity (as long as it is not "perfect") can be present resulting in a less efficient, but still unbiased estimate. The estimates will be less precise and highly sensitive to particular sets of data. Multicollinearity can be detected from condition number or the variance inflation factor, among other tests.

=== Spherical errors ===
The outer product of the error vector must be spherical.

$$\operatorname{E}[\,\boldsymbol{\varepsilon} \boldsymbol{\varepsilon}^{\operatorname{T}} \mid \mathbf{X} ]
= \operatorname{Var}[\,\boldsymbol{\varepsilon} \mid \mathbf{X} ]
= \begin{bmatrix}
\sigma^{2} & 0 & \cdots & 0 \\
0 & \sigma^{2} & \cdots & 0 \\
\vdots & \vdots & \ddots & \vdots \\
0 & 0 & \cdots & \sigma^{2}
\end{bmatrix}
= \sigma^{2} \mathbf{I}
\quad \text{with } \sigma^{2} > 0$$

This implies the error term has uniform variance (homoscedasticity) and no serial correlation. If this assumption is violated, OLS is still unbiased, but inefficient. The term "spherical errors" will describe the multivariate normal distribution: if $\operatorname{Var}[\,\boldsymbol{\varepsilon}\mid \mathbf{X} ] = \sigma^{2} \mathbf{I}$ in the multivariate normal density, then the equation $f(\varepsilon)=c$ is the formula for a ball centered at μ with radius σ in n-dimensional space.

Heteroskedasticity occurs when the amount of error is correlated with an independent variable. For example, in a regression on food expenditure and income, the error is correlated with income. Low income people generally spend a similar amount on food, while high income people may spend a very large amount or as little as low income people spend. Heteroskedastic can also be caused by changes in measurement practices. For example, as statistical offices improve their data, measurement error decreases, so the error term declines over time.

This assumption is violated when there is autocorrelation. Autocorrelation can be visualized on a data plot when a given observation is more likely to lie above a fitted line if adjacent observations also lie above the fitted regression line. Autocorrelation is common in time series data where a data series may experience "inertia." If a dependent variable takes a while to fully absorb a shock. Spatial autocorrelation can also occur geographic areas are likely to have similar errors. Autocorrelation may be the result of misspecification such as choosing the wrong functional form. In these cases, correcting the specification is one possible way to deal with autocorrelation.

When the spherical errors assumption may be violated, the generalized least squares estimator can be shown to be BLUE.

== See also ==
- Independent and identically distributed random variables
- Linear regression
- Measurement uncertainty

=== Other unbiased statistics ===
- Best linear unbiased prediction (BLUP)
- Minimum-variance unbiased estimator (MVUE)
