= Fama–MacBeth regression =

Method for estimating parameters

The Fama–MacBeth regression is a method used to estimate parameters for asset pricing models such as the capital asset pricing model (CAPM). The method estimates the betas and risk premia for any risk factors that are expected to determine asset prices.

== Methodology ==
The method works with multiple assets across time (panel data). The parameters are estimated in two steps:

1. First regress each of n asset returns against m proposed risk factors to determine each asset's beta exposures.
  $\begin{array}{lcr} R_{1,t} = \alpha_1 + \beta_{1,F_1}F_{1,t} + \beta_{1,F_2}F_{2,t} + \cdots + \beta_{1,F_m}F_{m,t} + \epsilon_{1,t} \\ R_{2,t} = \alpha_2 + \beta_{2,F_1}F_{1,t} + \beta_{2,F_2}F_{2,t} + \cdots + \beta_{2,F_m}F_{m,t} + \epsilon_{2,t} \\ \vdots \\ R_{n,t} = \alpha_{n} + \beta_{n,F_1}F_{1,t} + \beta_{n,F_2}F_{2,t} + \cdots + \beta_{n,F_m}F_{m,t} + \epsilon_{n,t}\end{array}$
2. Then regress all asset returns for each of the T time periods against the previously estimated betas to determine the factor return time series.
  $\begin{array}{lcr} R_{i,1} = \gamma_{1,0} + \gamma_{1,1}\hat{\beta}_{i,F_1} + \gamma_{1,2}\hat{\beta}_{i,F_2} + \cdots + \gamma_{1,m}\hat{\beta}_{i,F_m} + \epsilon_{i,1} \\ R_{i,2} = \gamma_{2,0} + \gamma_{2,1}\hat{\beta}_{i,F_1} + \gamma_{2,2}\hat{\beta}_{i,F_2} + \cdots + \gamma_{2,m}\hat{\beta}_{i,F_m} + \epsilon_{i,2} \\ \vdots \\ R_{i,T} = \gamma_{T,0} + \gamma_{T,1}\hat{\beta}_{i,F_1} + \gamma_{T,2}\hat{\beta}_{i,F_2} + \cdots + \gamma_{T,m}\hat{\beta}_{i,F_m} + \epsilon_{i,T}\end{array}$

The risk premiums of the factors are then estimated by the average factor returns, i.e. $\bar\gamma_{0} = \frac{1}{T} \sum_{t=1}^T \gamma_{t, 0}, \ldots, \bar\gamma_{m} = \frac{1}{T} \sum_{t=1}^T \gamma_{t, m}.$

Eugene F. Fama and James D. MacBeth (1973) demonstrated that the residuals of risk-return regressions and the observed "fair game" properties of the coefficients are consistent with an "efficient capital market" (quotes in the original).

Note that Fama MacBeth regressions provide standard errors corrected only for cross-sectional correlation. The standard errors from this method do not correct for time-series autocorrelation. This is usually not a problem for stock trading since stocks have weak time-series autocorrelation in daily and weekly holding periods, but autocorrelation is stronger over long horizons.

This means Fama MacBeth regressions may be inappropriate to use in many corporate finance settings where project holding periods tend to be long. For alternative methods of correcting standard errors for time series and cross-sectional correlation in the error term look into double clustering by firm and year.

== See also ==
- Capital asset pricing model
- Standard errors in regression analysis
