= Koenker =

Koenker is a surname. Notable people with the surname include:

- Deborah Koenker (born 1949), Canadian artist
- Diane Koenker, American professor of history
- Mark Koenker (born 1947), Canadian politician
- Roger Koenker (born 1947), American econometrician
