= Jason Abrevaya =

Jason Abrevaya is the Murray S. Johnson Chair in Economics at the University of Texas at Austin. He is noted for his research on econometric methodology - particularly quantile regression - and applications in microeconomics and demography.

== Selected publications ==
- Abrevaya, J. (2025). Probability and Statistics for Economics and Business: An Introduction Using R. MIT Press.
- Abrevaya, J. (2009). Are there missing girls in the United States? Evidence from birth data. American Economic Journal: Applied Economics, 1(2), 1-34.
- Abrevaya, J., & Dahl, C. M. (2008). The effects of birth inputs on birthweight: evidence from quantile estimation on panel data. Journal of Business & Economic Statistics, 26(4), 379–397.

== Faculty page ==
https://liberalarts.utexas.edu/economics/faculty/ja8294
