= Kenneth D. West =

American economist

- Born: 1953 (age 72–73)

Academic background
- Education: MIT (Ph.D.); Wesleyan University (B.A.)
- Doctoral advisor: Stanley Fischer

Academic work
- Discipline: Econometrics and Economics
- Institutions: University of Wisconsin–Madison
- Notable ideas: Newey–West estimator
- Website: Information at IDEAS / RePEc

Kenneth David West (born 1953) is the John D. MacArthur and Ragnar Frisch Professor of Economics in the Department of Economics at the University of Wisconsin. He is currently co-editor of the Journal of Money, Credit and Banking, and has previously served as co-editor of the American Economic Review. He has published widely in the fields of macroeconomics, finance, international economics and econometrics. Among his honors are the John M. Stauffer National Fellowship in Public Policy at the Hoover Institution, Alfred P. Sloan Research Fellowship, Fellow of the Econometric Society, and Abe Fellowship. He has been a research associate at the NBER since 1985.

West received a B.A. in economics and mathematics from Wesleyan University in 1973 and a Ph.D. from the Massachusetts Institute of Technology in 1983. He taught at Princeton University from 1983 to 1988 before joining the University of Wisconsin in 1988. He has held visiting scholar positions at several central banks and at several branches of the U.S. Federal Reserve System. He has published widely in the fields of macroeconomics, finance, international economics and econometrics. Administrative positions include two terms as chair of the Economics Department at the University of Wisconsin-Madison.

Academic Positions	Years Active
Princeton University	
Assistant Professor of Economics and Public Affairs	1983–1988
University of Wisconsin	
Associate Professor of Economics	1988–1990
Director, Social Systems Research Institute	1991–1994
Professor of Economics	1990–present
Ragnar Fischer Professor of Economics	1998–present
Department Chair	1999–2001, 2005–2008
John D. MacArthur Professor	2008–present

He is best known for developing, with Whitney K. Newey, the Newey–West estimator, which robustly estimates the covariance matrix of a regression model when errors are heteroskedastic and autocorrelated.

Honors	Year(s)
National Science Foundation Graduate Fellow	1980–1983
John M. Stauffer National Fellowship in Public Policy, Hoover Institution	1985–1986
Alfred P. Sloan Research Fellow	1989–1991
H. I. Romnes Faculty Fellowship, University of Wisconsin	1991
Fellow, Economics Society	1993
Mid-Career Faculty Fellowship, University of Wisconsin	1995
WARF/University Houses Professorship, University of Wisconsin	1998
Listed in Who's Who in Economics, 4th edition, M. Blaug (ed), Edward Elgar Publishing	2003
Fellow of the Journal of Econometrics	2007
Vilas Associate, University of Wisconsin	2008–2010
John D. MacArthur Professor, University of Wisconsin	2008
Distinguished Honors Faculty Award, University of Wisconsin	2010
Wim Duisenberg Research Fellowship, European Central Bank	2010, 2016
Founding Fellow, International Association for Applied Econometrics	2018

== Personal life ==
West lives in Madison, Wisconsin with his wife and two children.

== Contributions ==
=== Newey–West estimator ===
A Newey–West estimator is used in statistics and econometrics to provide an estimate of the covariance matrix of the parameters of a regression-type model when this model is applied in situations where the standard assumptions of regression analysis do not apply. It was devised by Whitney K. Newey and Kenneth D. West in 1987, although there are a number of later variants. The estimator is used to try to overcome autocorrelation (also called serial correlation), and heteroskedasticity in the error terms in the models, often for regressions applied to time series data.

== Selected publications ==
- Newey, Whitney K.; West, Kenneth D. (1987). "A Simple, Positive Semi-definite, Heteroskedasticity and Autocorrelation Consistent Covariance Matrix" (PDF). Econometrica. 55 (3): 703–708. doi:10.2307/1913610. JSTOR 1913610. S2CID 122867679.
- Newey, Whitney K.; West, Kenneth D. (1994). "Automatic Lag Selection in Covariance Matrix Estimation" (PDF). The Review of Economic Studies. 61 (4): 631–653. doi:10.2307/2297912. JSTOR 2297912. S2CID 120542581.
- West, Kenneth D. (1996). "Asymptotic Inference about Predictive Ability". Econometrica. 64 (5): 1067–1084. doi:10.2307/2171956. JSTOR 2171956.
- Newey, Whitney K.; West, Kenneth D. (1987). "Hypothesis Testing with Efficient Method of Moments Estimation". International Economic Review. 28 (3): 777–787. doi:10.2307/2526578. JSTOR 2526578.
- Engel, Charles; West, Kenneth D. (2005). "Exchange Rates and Fundamentals". Journal of Political Economy. 113 (3): 485–517. doi:10.1086/429137. JSTOR 429137. S2CID 10814162.
- Clark, Todd E; West, Kenneth D. (2007). "Approximately normal tests for equal predictive accuracy in nested models" (PDF). Journal of Econometrics. 138 (1): 291–311. doi:10.1016/j.jeconom.2006.05.023. S2CID 15575443.
- West, Kenneth D. (1987). "A Specification Test for Speculative Bubbles" (PDF). The Quarterly Journal of Economics. 102 (3): 553–580. doi:10.2307/1884217. JSTOR 1884217. S2CID 155036415.
- West, Kenneth D. (1988). "Dividend Innovations and Stock Price Volatility" (PDF). Econometrica. 56 (1): 37–61. doi:10.2307/1911841. JSTOR 1911841. S2CID 153798833.
- Cho, Dongchul; West, Kenneth D. (1995). "The predictive ability of several models of exchange rate volatility" (PDF). Journal of Econometrics. 69 (2): 367–391. doi:10.1016/0304-4076(94)01654-I. S2CID 125299789.
- West, Kenneth D. (1988). "Bubbles, Fads and Stock Price Volatility Tests: A Partial Evaluation" (PDF). The Journal of Finance. 43 (3): 639–656. doi:10.1111/j.1540-6261.1988.tb04596.x. JSTOR 2328188.
- West, Kenneth D. (1988). "Asymptotic Normality, When Regressors Have a Unit Root". Econometrica. 56 (6): 1397–1417. doi:10.2307/1913104. JSTOR 1913104.
- West, Kenneth D. (2006). Forecast Evaluation. Vol. 1. pp. 99–134. doi:10.1016/S1574-0706(05)01003-7. ISBN 978-0-444-51395-3.
