= Susanne Schennach =

Econometrician

- Citizenship: Austria

Academic background
- Education: B.A. (1996), Brandeis University; S.M., Massachusetts Institute of Technology; Ph.D (2000), Massachusetts Institute of Technology
- Academic advisors: Whitney Kent Newey; Thomas M. Stoker

Academic work
- Discipline: econometrics
- Institutions: University of Chicago (2000–2011); Brown University (2011–)
- Awards: Frisch Medal
- Website: Information at IDEAS / RePEc

Susanne Maria Schennach is an economist and professor at Brown University. She is an econometrician whose work focuses on measurement error.

Schennach has been an assistant editor at The Econometrics Journal, Econometric Theory, and Econometrica.

== Early life and education ==
Schennach is a native of Innsbruck, and remains a citizen of Austria.

She received a B.A. in economics and French language and literature from Brandeis University in 1996, and a Ph.D. in economics from the Massachusetts Institute of Technology in 2000, where her advisers were Whitney Kent Newey and Thomas M. Stoker. Her thesis was titled "Estimation of Nonlinear Models with Measurement Error".

== Career ==
Schennach was an assistant professor at the University of Chicago Department of Economics from 2000 to 2006, associate professor from 2006 to 2007, and professor from 2007 to 2011. Schennach has been a professor at Brown University since 2011.

Schennach's interest in measurement error grew out of a research product on productivity in the United States coal industry that she worked on as a graduate student.

She was named a Fellow of the Econometric Society in 2014. Schennach and coauthors Flávio Cunha and James Heckman were awarded the Frisch Medal in 2014 for their 2010 paper "Estimating the Technology of Cognitive and Noncognitive Skill Formation".

== Selected research ==
- Cunha, F.; Heckman, J.; Schennach, S. (May 2010). "Estimating the Technology of Cognitive and Noncognitive Skill Formation". Econometrica. 78 (3): 883–931. doi:10.3982/ECTA6551. hdl:10419/35965. PMC 2885826. PMID 20563300.
- Hu, Yingyao; Schennach, Susanne M. (2008). "Instrumental Variable Treatment of Nonclassical Measurement Error Models". Econometrica. 76 (1): 195–216. doi:10.1111/j.0012-9682.2008.00823.x. ISSN 0012-9682.
- Schennach, Susanne M. (2016-10-31). "Recent Advances in the Measurement Error Literature". Annual Review of Economics. 8 (1): 341–377. doi:10.1146/annurev-economics-080315-015058. ISSN 1941-1383. S2CID 125152559.
