= Whitney K. Newey =

American economist

- Born: July 17, 1954 (age 72); United States

Academic background
- Education: MIT (Ph.D.); BYU (B.A.)
- Doctoral advisor: Jerry A. Hausman

Academic work
- Discipline: Econometrics
- Institutions: MIT
- Doctoral students: Yacine Ait-Sahalia; Alberto Abadie; Susanne Schennach
- Notable ideas: Newey–West estimator
- Website: Information at IDEAS / RePEc

Whitney Kent Newey (born July 17, 1954) is the Ford Professor of Economics at the Massachusetts Institute of Technology and a well-known econometrician. He is best known for developing, with Kenneth D. West, the Newey–West estimator, which robustly estimates the covariance matrix of a regression model when errors are heteroskedastic and autocorrelated.

== Education and academic career ==
Newey received his B.A. from Brigham Young University in 1978, and his Ph.D. from the Massachusetts Institute of Technology in 1983, under supervision of Jerry A. Hausman. From 1983 to 1988, Newey taught at Princeton University as an assistant professor. He was then promoted to Associate Professor and taught there for another two year from 1988 to 1990. It is also during these two years, he became a Member of Technical Staff, Bell Communications Research. During his time in Princeton University, he published many papers on econometrics. After 7 years in Princeton, he returned to Massachusetts Institute of Technology as a professor in the department of economics in 1990 and has been in the department of economics since then. From 2011 to 2016, he was also the chair of economics.

== Publications ==
- — (1985). "Generalized Method of Moments Specification Testing". Journal of Econometrics. 29 (3): 229–256. doi:10.1016/0304-4076(85)90154-X.
- —; Powell, James L. (1987). "Asymmetric Least Squares Estimation and Testing". Econometrica. 5 (4): 819–847. doi:10.2307/1911031. JSTOR 1911031.
- — (1989). "Adaptive estimation of regression models via moment restrictions". Journal of Econometrics. 38 (3): 301–339. doi:10.1016/0304-4076(88)90048-6.
- —; Powell, James L. (1990). "Efficient Estimation of Linear and Type I Censored Regression Models Under Conditional Quantile Restrictions". Econometric Theory. 6 (3): 295–317. doi:10.1017/S0266466600005284. S2CID 119782828.
- — (1990). "Efficient Instrumental Variables Estimation of Nonlinear Models". Econometrica. 58 (4): 809–837. doi:10.2307/2938351. JSTOR 2938351.
- — (1991). "Uniform Convergence in Probability and Stochastic Equicontinuity". Econometrica. 59 (4): 1161–1167. doi:10.2307/2938179. JSTOR 2938179.
- — (1994). "The Asymptotic Variance of Semiparametric Estimators". Econometrica. 62 (6): 1349–1382. doi:10.2307/2951752. hdl:1721.1/63275. JSTOR 2951752.
- — (1994). "Series Estimation of Regression Functionals". Econometric Theory. 10 (1): 1–28. doi:10.1017/S0266466600008203. JSTOR 3532652. S2CID 123138033.
- — (2004). "Efficient Estimation Of Semiparametric Models Via Moment Restrictions". Econometrica. 72 (6): 1877–1897. doi:10.1111/j.1468-0262.2004.00557.x. hdl:10.1111/j.1468-0262.2004.00557.x. JSTOR 3598771.
