= Jeffrey Wooldridge =

American econometrician

Jeffrey M. Wooldridge
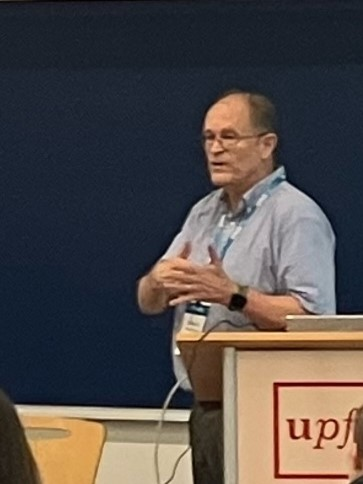
- Wooldridge in 2024
- Born: 1960 (age 65–66); California, US

Academic background
- Education: University of California, San Diego
- Doctoral advisor: Halbert White

Academic work
- Discipline: Econometrics
- Institutions: Michigan State University, Massachusetts Institute of Technology
- Website: Information at IDEAS / RePEc

Jeffrey Marc Wooldridge (born 1960) is an American econometrician. He is a University Distinguished Professor in the Department of Economics at Michigan State University. Wooldridge is known for his theoretical contributions to the analysis of cross-sectional and panel data.

== Early life and education ==
Wooldridge was born in 1960 to parents Nancy A. Williams and J. Cameron in Concord, California. Growing up, he participated in the 1970 Concord American Little League junior division championship with the Jets Hornets Owls. Wooldridge attended Clayton Valley Charter High School where he received the Dr Richard Irvine Scholar-Athlete Award for earning two varsity letters and posting the highest GPA at the school. Following high school, Wooldridge earned a double Bachelor of Arts degree in computer science and economics at the University of California, Berkeley in 1982. After graduating with High Distinction in General Scholarship, Wooldridge completed his Ph.D. at the University of California, San Diego.

== Career ==
Following his PhD, Wooldridge spent five years as an assistant professor of economics at the Massachusetts Institute of Technology. He left the institution in 1991 to join the Department of Economics faculty at Michigan State University. Upon joining the faculty, he published Introductory Econometrics: A Modern Approach, and was shortly thereafter named a Distinguished Professor. Wooldridge was named a Fellow of the Econometric Society in 2002, and was ranked 6th worldwide among econometric theorists. In 2009, Wooldridge became the co-director of an interdisciplinary program focused on training researchers who use methods from economics to address critical policy issues in education. Shortly after, Wooldridge became the co-recipient of a federal grant to evaluate and identify "which commonly-used value-added models accurately estimate the effects of teachers, schools and instructional practices." In 2013, he co-established a summer workshop in Advanced Econometrics entitled ÊSTIMATE (Early Summer Tutorial In Modern Applied Tools of Econometrics). In 2017, Wooldridge was recognized as being amongst the world's most highly cited researchers. He was elected a vice-president of the American Economic Association for 2025.
