= Scenario optimization =

The scenario approach or scenario optimization approach is a technique for obtaining solutions to robust optimization and chance-constrained optimization problems based on a sample of the constraints. It also relates to inductive reasoning in modeling and decision-making. The technique has existed for decades as a heuristic approach and has more recently been given a systematic theoretical foundation.

In optimization, robustness features translate into constraints that are parameterized by the uncertain elements of the problem. In the scenario method, a solution is obtained by only looking at a random sample of constraints (heuristic approach) called scenarios and a deeply-grounded theory tells the user how “robust” the corresponding solution is related to other constraints. This theory justifies the use of randomization in robust and chance-constrained optimization.

== Data-driven optimization ==
At times, scenarios are obtained as random extractions from a model. More often, however, scenarios are instances of the uncertain constraints that are obtained as observations (data-driven science). In this latter case, no model of uncertainty is needed to generate scenarios. Moreover, most remarkably, also in this case scenario optimization comes accompanied by a full-fledged theory because all scenario optimization results are distribution-free and can therefore be applied even when a model of uncertainty is not available.

== Theoretical results ==
For constraints that are convex (e.g. in semidefinite problems, involving LMIs (Linear Matrix Inequalities)), a deep theoretical analysis has been established which shows that the probability that a new constraint is not satisfied follows a distribution that is dominated by a Beta distribution. This result is tight since it is exact for a whole class of convex problems. More generally, various empirical levels have been shown to follow a Dirichlet distribution, whose marginals are beta distribution. The scenario approach with $L_1$ regularization has also been considered, and handy algorithms with reduced computational complexity are available. Extensions to more complex, non-convex, set-ups are still objects of active investigation.

Along the scenario approach, it is also possible to pursue a risk-return trade-off. Moreover, a full-fledged method can be used to apply this approach to control. First $N$ constraints are sampled and then the user starts removing some of the constraints in succession. This can be done in different ways, even according to greedy algorithms. After elimination of one more constraint, the optimal solution is updated, and the corresponding optimal value is determined. As this procedure moves on, the user constructs an empirical “curve of values”, i.e. the curve representing the value achieved after the removing of an increasing number of constraints. The scenario theory provides precise evaluations of how robust the various solutions are.

A remarkable advance in the theory has been established by the recent wait-and-judge approach: one assesses the complexity of the solution (as precisely defined in the referenced article) and from its value formulates precise evaluations on the robustness of the solution. These results shed light on deeply-grounded links between the concepts of complexity and risk. A related approach, named "Repetitive Scenario Design" aims at reducing the sample complexity of the solution by repeatedly alternating a scenario design phase (with reduced number of samples) with a randomized check of the feasibility of the ensuing solution.

== Example ==
Consider a function $R_\delta(x)$ which represents the return of an investment; it depends on our vector of investment choices $x$ and on the market state $\delta$ which will be experienced at the end of the investment period.

Given a stochastic model for the market conditions, we consider $N$ of the possible states $\delta_1, \dots, \delta_N$ (randomization of uncertainty). Alternatively, the scenarios $\delta_i$ can be obtained from a record of observations.

We set out to solve the scenario optimization program

$$\max_x \min_{i=1,\dots,N} R_{\delta_i}(x). \ \ \ \ \ \ \ \ \ \ \ \ \ \ \ (1)$$

This corresponds to choosing a portfolio vector x so as to obtain the best possible return in the worst-case scenario.

After solving (1), an optimal investment strategy $x^\ast$ is achieved along with the corresponding optimal return $R^\ast$. While $R^\ast$ has been obtained by looking at $N$ possible market states only, the scenario theory tells us that the solution is robust up to a level $\varepsilon$, that is, the return $R^\ast$ will be achieved with probability $1 - \varepsilon$ for other market states.

In quantitative finance, the worst-case approach can be overconservative. One alternative is to discard some odd situations to reduce pessimism; moreover, scenario optimization can be applied to other risk-measures including CVaR – Conditional Value at Risk – so adding to the flexibility of its use.

== Application fields ==
Fields of application include: prediction, systems theory, regression analysis (Interval Predictor Models in particular), Actuarial science, optimal control, financial mathematics, machine learning, decision making, supply chain, and management.
