= Halbert White =

American economist

Halbert Lynn White
- Born: November 19, 1950; Kansas City, Missouri, U.S.
- Died: March 31, 2012 (aged 61); San Diego, California, U.S.

Academic background
- Education: Princeton University (BA); Massachusetts Institute of Technology (PhD)
- Doctoral advisor: Jerry A. Hausman; Robert Solow; Lester Thurow

Academic work
- Discipline: Econometrics
- Institutions: University of Rochester; University of California, San Diego
- Doctoral students: Jeffrey Wooldridge, Kuan Chung-ming
- Notable ideas: White test Heteroscedasticity-consistent standard errors

Halbert Lynn White Jr. (November 19, 1950 – March 31, 2012) was the Chancellor's Associates Distinguished Professor of Economics at the University of California, San Diego, and a Fellow of the Econometric Society and the American Academy of Arts and Sciences.

== Education and career ==
White, a native of Kansas City, Missouri, graduated salutatorian from Southwest High School in 1968. He went on to study at Princeton University, receiving his B.A. in economics in 1972. He earned his Ph.D. in economics at the Massachusetts Institute of Technology in 1976, under the supervision of Jerry A. Hausman and Robert Solow. White spent his first years as an assistant professor in the University of Rochester before moving to University of California, San Diego (UCSD) in 1979. He remained at UCSD until his untimely death from cancer.

== Research ==
White was well known in the field of econometrics for his 1980 paper on robust standard errors (which is among the most-cited paper in economics since 1970), and for the heteroscedasticity-consistent estimator and the test for heteroskedasticity that are named after him. A 1982 paper by White contributed strongly to the development of quasi-maximum likelihood estimation. He also contributed to numerous other areas such as neural networks and medicine. In 1999, White co-founded an economic consulting firm, Bates White, which is based in Washington, D.C.

== Bibliography ==
=== Books ===
- White, Halbert (1992). Artificial neural networks: approximation and learning theory. Oxford, UK. ISBN 1-55786-329-6. OCLC 25202646.
- White, Halbert (1994). Estimation, inference, and specification analysis. Cambridge: Cambridge University Press. ISBN 0-521-25280-6. OCLC 26673547.
- White, Halbert (1998). Advances in Econometric Theory: The selected works of Halbert White. Cheltenham, UK: E. Elgar. ISBN 1-85898-222-7. OCLC 38485926.
- White, Halbert (2001). Asymptotic theory for econometricians (Rev. ed.). San Diego: Academic Press. ISBN 0-12-746652-5. OCLC 46634737.
- White, Halbert (2004). New perspectives in econometric theory: The selected works of Halbert White. Cheltenham: Edward Elgar. ISBN 1-84376-586-1. OCLC 53458595.

=== Selected papers ===
- White, Halbert (1982), "Maximum Likelihood Estimation of Misspecified Models", Econometrica, 50 (1): 1–25, doi:10.2307/1912526, hdl:10338.dmlcz/142956, JSTOR 1912526
- White, Halbert (1980), "A Heteroskedasticity-Consistent Covariance Matrix Estimator and a Direct Test for Heteroskedasticity", Econometrica, 48 (4): 817–838, doi:10.2307/1912934, JSTOR 1912934
- Hornik, Kurt; Stinchcombe, Maxwell; White, Halbert (1989). "Multilayer feedforward networks are universal approximators". Neural Networks. 2 (5): 359–366. doi:10.1016/0893-6080(89)90020-8. ISSN 0893-6080. S2CID 2757547.
