= Journal of Money, Credit and Banking =

- Discipline: Monetary and financial economics
- Language: English
- Edited by: Sanjay Chugh, Robert DeYoung, Pok-sang Lam, Kenneth D. West

Publication details
- History: 1969––present
- Publisher: Wiley-Blackwell on behalf of the Ohio State University Department of Economics (United States)
- Frequency: 7/year
- Impact factor: 1.470 (2017)

Standard abbreviations
- ISO 4: J. Money Credit Bank.

Indexing
- ISSN: 0022-2879 (print); 1538-4616 (web)
- LCCN: 70012309
- JSTOR: 00222879
- OCLC no.: 1783384

Links
- Journal homepage; Journal page at publisher's website; Online access; Online archive

The Journal of Money, Credit and Banking is a peer-reviewed academic journal covering monetary and financial issues in macroeconomics. It is published by Wiley-Blackwell on behalf of the Ohio State University Department of Economics. The editors-in-chief are Sanjay Chugh (Ohio State University), Robert DeYoung (University of Kansas), Pok-sang Lam (Ohio State University), Kenneth D. West (University of Wisconsin–Madison).

== Replicability ==
In 2004, the American Economic Review instituted a mandatory archive for the submission of data and code used in economic journal submissions to ensure the replicability and legitimacy of research. An analysis of the Journal of Money, Credit and Banking's archive from 1996 to 2003 found that only 14 of 186 empirical articles could be replicated. Some economists have published suggestions regarding procedures to ensure the replicability of journal articles. As a result, the journal's editors amended their procedures beginning with the December 2006 issue. The amendments did not render the desired outcomes. In the December 2006 issue, only 2 of 9 empirical articles had data and code in the archive, neither of which could reproduce the published results.

== See also ==
- List of scholarly journals in economics
