= Friedhelm Eicker =

German mathematician (1927–2022)

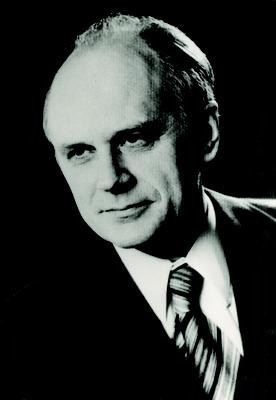
- Born: 5 April 1927; Radevormwald, North Rhine-Westphalia, Germany
- Died: 19 March 2022 (aged 94)
- Education: University of Mainz
- Known for: Heteroscedasticity-consistent standard errors
- Scientific career
- Fields: Statistics
- Workplaces: University of Dortmund
- Thesis: Statistische Theorie der Phasenumwandlung von Paraffinkristallen: Unter Berücksichtigung der Molekülverdrillung bei mittlerer Kettenlänge (1956)
- Doctoral students: Thomas Royen
- Website: www.statistik.tu-dortmund.de/eicker.html

Friedhelm Eicker (5 April 1927 – 19 March 2022) was a German statistician and former professor at the University of Dortmund. He is known for his contributions in the development of heteroscedasticity-consistent standard errors.

A native of Radevormwald, Eicker earned his PhD from the University of Mainz in 1956.
