= Michael C. Lovell =

American economist (1930–2018)

- Born: April 11, 1930; Cambridge, Massachusetts, U.S.
- Died: December 20, 2018 (aged 88); New Haven, Connecticut, U.S.

Academic background
- Education: Harvard University; Stanford University; Reed College
- Doctoral advisor: Wassily Leontief
- Influences: Edwin Mills; Guy Orcutt

Academic work
- Institutions: Wesleyan University; Carnegie Mellon University
- Doctoral students: Dale T. Mortensen; Edward C. Prescott
- Notable ideas: Frisch–Waugh–Lovell theorem
- Website: Information at IDEAS / RePEc

Michael Christopher Lovell (April 11, 1930 – December 20, 2018) was an American economist. He was the Chester D. Hubbard Professor of Economics and Social Science at Wesleyan University from 1969 to 2002, professor of economics at Carnegie-Mellon from 1963 to 1969, and assistant professor of economics at Yale from 1958 to 1963.

A native of Cambridge, Massachusetts, Lovell earned his PhD from Harvard University with a dissertation on inventories that was later published in parts in Econometrica.

Lovell's older brother Hugh Gilbert Lovell was also an economist. Their father, R. Ivan Lovell, was a professor of history at Willamette University from 1937 to 1966.

Michael C. Lovell died on December 20, 2018, at the age of 88.
