= Roger Koenker =

American econometrician (born 1947)

Roger W. Koenker
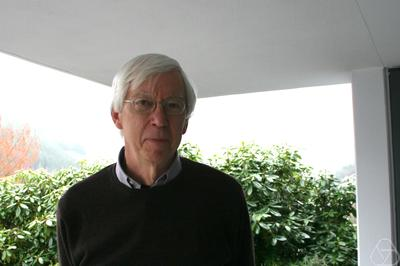
- Born: February 21, 1947 (age 79)
- Education: Grinnell College; University of Michigan
- Known for: Quantile regression
- Scientific career
- Fields: Econometrics
- Workplaces: Bell Labs; University of Illinois Urbana-Champaign; University College London
- Doctoral advisor: Saul Hymans

Roger William Koenker (born February 21, 1947) is an American econometrician mostly known for his contributions to quantile regression. He is currently an Honorary Professor of Economics at University College London.

== Education and career ==
He finished his degree at Grinnell College in 1969 and obtained his Ph.D. in Economics from the University of Michigan in 1974. In the same year, he was employed as an assistant professor at UIUC. By 1976, he left the university to work as part of the technical staff at Bell Telephone Laboratories. He came back to UIUC in 1983 to teach as a William B. McKinley Professor of Economics and Statistics before becoming an Honorary Professor of Economics at UCL in 2018.

== Works ==
Koenker is best known for his work on quantile regression and the regression analysis tool he developed is widely used across many disciplines. In 2010, he was awarded the Emanuel and Carol Parzen Prize for Statistical Innovation for his contribution to the field and for "pioneering and expositing quantile regression." Aside from his seminal book, Quantile Regression, his published works include The Gaussian Hare and the Laplacian Tortoise: Computability of Squared-Error vs. Absolute Error Estimators; and, Galton, Edgeworth, Frisch, and Prospects for Quantile Regression in Economics, among others.
