= Deborah Koenker =

Canadian artist (born 1949)

- Born: 1949 (age 76–77); Chicago, Illinois, United States
- Education: UC Santa Barbara; Saint Martin's School of Art; Claremont Graduate University
- Known for: Installation art

Deborah Koenker (born 1949) is an interdisciplinary artist. Her installation art explores social and feminist themes using a wide range of media. She is interested in a number of issues, such as social justice. She is also a writer and curator.

== Career ==
Deborah Koenker was born in 1949 in Chicago. After she received her BA at the University of California, Santa Barbara in 1971, she did post-graduate studies at Saint Martin's School of Art, in London, England (1972–1973) and then in 1973 moved to Vancouver where, in 1975, she became one of the founding members of the Malaspina Print Society, a cooperative artist studio, and its first director. Her early practice was aesthetically object-based, printmaking and sculpture that evolved into installation art which she found fascinating because in creating it she worked with space and couldn't predict the result. She went back to art school in 1985 and received her MFA from Claremont Graduate University, Claremont, California. In 1992, she left behind her object-based work.

== Exhibitions ==
For the past three decades Koenker has exhibited prints, drawings, sculpture and mixed media installations in public galleries and artist-run centres in Canada, the USA and Mexico, but in time, crossed over from traditional to non-traditional practice. In 1999, she did an installation for her solo show Adrift at the Open Space Gallery in Victoria which travelled to the Richmond Art Gallery in Richmond, BC. The show conveyed dealing with daily illness, in Koenker's case, Chronic Fatigue Immune Dysfunction Syndrome (CFIDS).

In 2002, Koenker began Learning to Draw, embroidery over drawings and engravings of the Old Masters (still ongoing). In 2003, she became interested in the Mexican agricultural workers in the Okanagan and began work on a project that took three years to complete and involved 84 volunteer participants, Las Desaparecidas (The Missing ones), shown in 2006 in Mexico, the U.S. and Canada. She developed the show with the help of people living in the town of Tapalpa, Jalisco, Mexico, who participated in creating a long textile piece with their embroidered fingerprints. Together with digital photos of these participants and the names or photos of victims, it was a tribute to the hundreds of missing and murdered women and girls in Ciudad Juárez and Chihuahua City — mostly poor factory workers employed in the primarily US owned manufacturing plants along the border.

In 2016, Koenker completed a solo exhibition at the Kelowna Art Gallery on migrant Mexican farmworkers hired by the Okanagan Valley's fruit orchards and vineyards titled Deborah Koenker: Grapes and Tortillas. (The words "Grapes and Tortillas" are from a poem by Lawrence Ferlinghetti). Through the show, Koenker hoped to give viewers some sense of the culture of Mexico, including its darker side. The show was a tribute to the farmworkers, their life, beliefs and what matters to them. As well as portraits in photographs of 160 of the men and women, Koenker added other elements to the overall installation. The largest of these referred to Mexican shrines. There was also a facsimile of a Mexican kitchen, and a shrine to the Virgin of Guadalupe, accompanied by a musical soundtrack. In 2016 as well, she did a residency/exhibition for the Klondike Institute of Art and Culture in Dawson City, Yukon, a collaborative project with Karen Kazmer aka Volcano Collective.

== Public collections ==
Her work is included in many public collections, such as the Art Gallery of Greater Victoria. A full list is given in the catalogue for Deborah Koenker: Grapes and Tortillas, pages 141–142.

== Curatorial work ==
Koenker's practice also involves curatorial projects, catalogue essays and reviews, such as the exhibition which she curated, Wanda Koop's Face To Face, in 2009–2010 at the Richmond Art Gallery, Richmond, British Columbia. In 2016, she left her position as an Associate Professor in Visual Arts at Emily Carr University in Vancouver to concentrate on her art practice.
