= Outline of regression analysis =

Overview of and topical guide to regression analysis

The following outline is provided as an overview of and topical guide to regression analysis:

Regression analysis – use of statistical techniques for learning about the relationship between one or more dependent variables (Y) and one or more independent variables (X).

== Overview articles ==
- Regression analysis
- Linear regression

== Non-statistical articles related to regression ==
- Least squares
- Linear least squares (mathematics)
- Non-linear least squares
- Least absolute deviations
- Curve fitting
- Smoothing
- Cross-sectional study

== Basic statistical ideas related to regression ==
- Conditional expectation
- Correlation
- Correlation coefficient
- Mean square error
- Residual sum of squares
- Explained sum of squares
- Total sum of squares

== Visualization ==
- Scatterplot

== Linear regression based on least squares ==
- General linear model
- Ordinary least squares
- Generalized least squares
- Simple linear regression
- Trend estimation
- Ridge regression
- Polynomial regression
- Segmented regression
- Nonlinear regression

== Generalized linear models ==
- Generalized linear models
- Logistic regression
  - Multinomial logit
  - Ordered logit
- Probit model
  - Multinomial probit
  - Ordered probit
- Poisson regression
- Maximum likelihood
- Cochrane–Orcutt estimation

== Computation ==
- Numerical methods for linear least squares

== Inference for regression models ==
- F-test
- t-test
- Lack-of-fit sum of squares
- Confidence band
- Coefficient of determination
- Multiple correlation
- Scheffé's method

== Challenges to regression modeling ==
- Autocorrelation
- Cointegration
- Multicollinearity
- Homoscedasticity and heteroscedasticity
- Lack of fit
- Non-normality of errors
- Outliers

== Diagnostics for regression models ==
- Regression model validation
- Studentized residual
- Cook's distance
- Variance inflation factor
- DFFITS
- Partial residual plot
- Partial regression plot
- Leverage
- Durbin–Watson statistic
- Condition number

== Formal aids to model selection ==
- Model selection
- Mallows's C_{p}
- Akaike information criterion
- Bayesian information criterion
- Hannan–Quinn information criterion
- Cross validation

== Robust regression ==
- Robust regression

== Terminology ==
- Linear model — relates to meaning of "linear"
- Dependent and independent variables
- Errors and residuals in statistics
- Hat matrix
- Trend-stationary process
- Cross-sectional data
- Time series

== Methods for dependent data ==
- Mixed model
- Random effects model
- Hierarchical linear models

== Nonparametric regression ==
- Nonparametric regression
- Isotonic regression

== Semiparametric regression ==
- Semiparametric regression
- Local regression

== Other forms of regression ==
- Total least squares regression
- Deming regression
- Errors-in-variables model
- Instrumental variables regression
- Quantile regression
- Generalized additive model
- Autoregressive model
- Moving average model
- Autoregressive moving average model
- Autoregressive integrated moving average
- Autoregressive conditional heteroskedasticity

== See also ==
- Prediction
- Design of experiments
- Data transformation
- Box–Cox transformation
- Machine learning
- Analysis of variance
- Causal inference
