= Anscombe's quartet =

Four data sets with the same descriptive statistics, yet very different distributions

The four datasets composing Anscombe's quartet. All four sets have almost identical statistical parameters, but the graphs show them to be considerably different.

Anscombe's quartet comprises four datasets that have nearly identical simple descriptive statistics, yet have very different distributions and appear very different when graphed. Each dataset consists of eleven (x, y) points. They were constructed in 1973 by the statistician Francis Anscombe to demonstrate both the importance of graphing data when analyzing it, and the effect of outliers and other influential observations on statistical properties. He described the article as being intended to counter the impression among statisticians that "numerical calculations are exact, but graphs are rough".

== Data ==
For all four datasets:

Property	Value	Accuracy
Mean of x	9	exact
Sample variance of x: s^{2}_{x}	11	exact
Mean of y	7.50	to 2 decimal places
Sample variance of y: s^{2}_{y}	4.125	±0.003
Correlation between x and y	0.816	to 3 decimal places
Linear regression line	y = 3.00 + 0.500x	to 2 and 3 decimal places, respectively
Coefficient of determination of the linear regression: $R^2$	0.67	to 2 decimal places

- The first scatter plot (top left) appears to be a simple linear relationship, corresponding to two correlated variables, where y could be modelled as Gaussian with mean linearly dependent on x.
- For the second graph (top right), while a relationship between the two variables is obvious, it is not linear, and the Pearson correlation coefficient is not relevant. A more general regression and the corresponding coefficient of determination would be more appropriate.
- In the third graph (bottom left), the modelled relationship is linear, but should have a different regression line (a robust regression would have been called for). The calculated regression is offset by the one outlier, which exerts enough influence to lower the correlation coefficient from 1 to 0.816.
- Finally, the fourth graph (bottom right) shows an example when one high-leverage point is enough to produce a high correlation coefficient, even though the other data points do not indicate any relationship between the variables.

The quartet is still often used to illustrate the importance of looking at a set of data graphically before starting to analyze according to a particular type of relationship, and the inadequacy of basic statistic properties for describing realistic datasets.

The datasets are as follows. The x values are the same for the first three datasets.

Anscombe's quartet
Dataset I		Dataset II		Dataset III		Dataset IV	
x	y	x	y	x	y	x	y
10.0	8.04	10.0	9.14	10.0	7.46	8.0	6.58
8.0	6.95	8.0	8.14	8.0	6.77	8.0	5.76
13.0	7.58	13.0	8.74	13.0	12.74	8.0	7.71
9.0	8.81	9.0	8.77	9.0	7.11	8.0	8.84
11.0	8.33	11.0	9.26	11.0	7.81	8.0	8.47
14.0	9.96	14.0	8.10	14.0	8.84	8.0	7.04
6.0	7.24	6.0	6.13	6.0	6.08	8.0	5.25
4.0	4.26	4.0	3.10	4.0	5.39	19.0	12.50
12.0	10.84	12.0	9.13	12.0	8.15	8.0	5.56
7.0	4.82	7.0	7.26	7.0	6.42	8.0	7.91
5.0	5.68	5.0	4.74	5.0	5.73	8.0	6.89

It is not known how Anscombe created his datasets. Since its publication, several methods to generate similar datasets with identical statistics and dissimilar graphics have been developed. One of these, the Datasaurus dozen, consists of points tracing out the outline of a dinosaur, plus twelve other datasets that have the same summary statistics.

== See also ==
- Exploratory data analysis
- Goodness of fit
- Regression validation
- Simpson's paradox
- Statistical model validation
