= Chiaromonte (surname) =

Chiaromonte is an Italian surname. Notable people with the surname include:

- Francesca Chiaromonte, Italian statistician
- Gerardo Chiaromonte (1924–1993), Italian Communist politician, journalist and writer
- Nicola Chiaromonte (1905–1972), Italian activist and writer
