= Dawn Porter =

Dawn Porter may refer to:

- Dawn Porter (filmmaker), American producer and director
- Dawn C. Porter, American business professor
- Dawn O'Porter (born 1979), British television presenter
- Nyree Dawn Porter (1936–2001), actress
