= Q test =

Q test may refer to several statistical tests:

- Dixon's Q test
- Cochran's Q test
