= R. Dennis Cook =

American statistician

Ralph Dennis Cook
- Born: June 20, 1944 (age 82)
- Education: Montana State University; Kansas State University
- Known for: Cook's distance Cook–Weisberg test
- Scientific career
- Doctoral students: Francesca Chiaromonte; Liliana Forzani

Ralph Dennis Cook (born June 20, 1944) is an American statistician, mostly known for Cook's distance and the Cook–Weisberg test. Cook is a professor of statistics at the University of Minnesota.

After graduating from Northern Montana College (1967), Cook earned his master's (1969) and Ph.D. (1971) degrees from Kansas State University. His dissertation, The Dynamics of Finite Populations: The Effects of Variable Selection Intensity and Population Size on the Expected Time to Fixation and the Ultimate Probability of Fixation of an Allele, was supervised by Raj Nassar.

He is the author of several books, including Introduction to Envelopes: Dimension Reduction for Efficient Estimation in Multivariate Statistics and Residuals and Influence in Regression.

In 1982 he was elected as a Fellow of the American Statistical Association.
