= Liliana Forzani =

Argentine applied mathematician and statistician

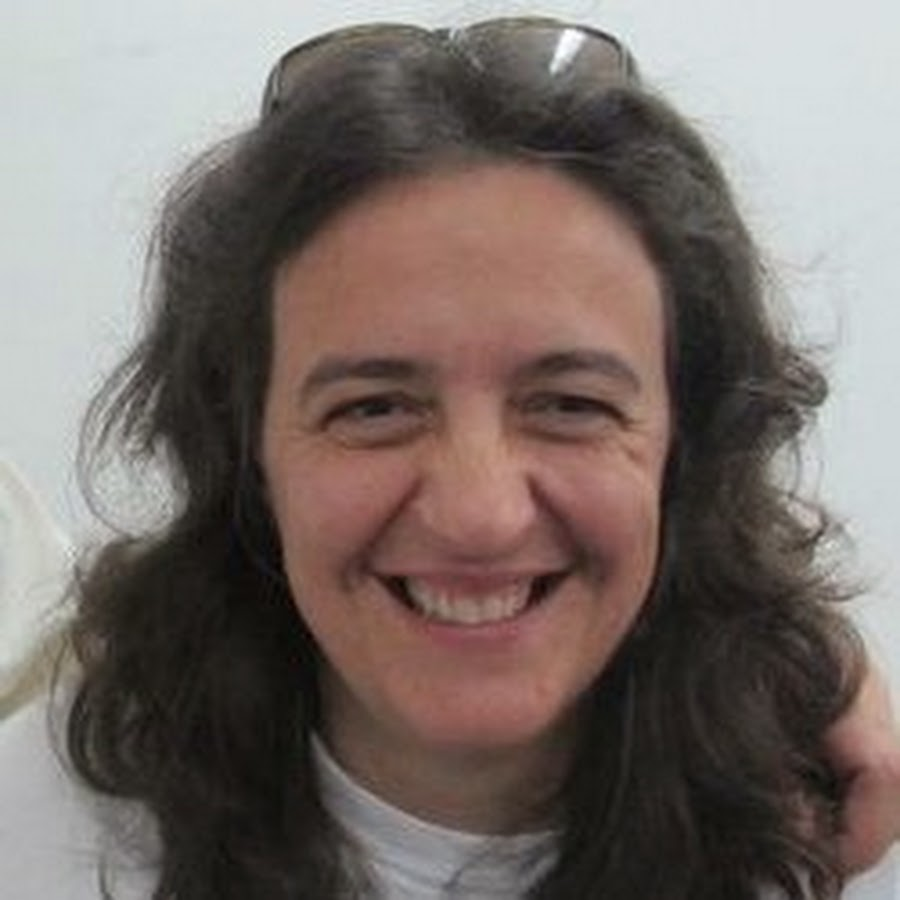
Forzani in 2017

Liliana María Forzani is an Argentine applied mathematician and statistician, a researcher for the Argentine National Scientific and Technical Research Council (CONICET), a professor at the National University of the Littoral in Santa Fe, Argentina, and the first woman president of the Mathematical Union of Latin America and Caribbean (UMALCA).

Forzani studied applied mathematics at the National University of the Littoral, earning a degree in 1988. She has two doctorates,, the first in mathematics in 1993 from the National University of San Luis, supervised by Hugo Aimar. Her second Ph.D., in 2007, concerned dimensionality reduction in statistical regression. It was supervised by R. Dennis Cook at the University of Minnesota.

She is a 2008 recipient of the L'Oreal-UNESCO-Conicet prize for Women in science, and the French-Argentine "Scientists Who Count" Award. She has served as Argentina's representative to the International Mathematical Union Committee for Women in Mathematics, and was elected president of the Mathematical Union of Latin America and the Caribbean for the 2021–2024 term.
