= Partial residual plot =

Graphical technique in statistics to show error in a model

In applied statistics, a partial residual plot is a graphical technique that attempts to show the relationship between a given independent variable and the response variable given that other independent variables are also in the model.

== Background ==
When performing a linear regression with a single independent variable, a scatter plot of the response variable against the independent variable provides a good indication of the nature of the relationship. If there is more than one independent variable, things become more complicated. Although it can still be useful to generate scatter plots of the response variable against each of the independent variables, this does not take into account the effect of the other independent variables in the model.

== Definition ==
Partial residual plots are formed as

$$\text{Residuals} + \hat{\beta}_iX_i \text{ versus } X_i,$$

where

Residuals = residuals from the full model,
$\hat{\beta}_i$ = regression coefficient from the i-th independent variable in the full model,
X_{i} = the i-th independent variable.

Partial residual plots are widely discussed in the regression diagnostics literature (e.g., see the References section below). Although they can often be useful, they can also fail to indicate the proper relationship. In particular, if X_{i} is highly correlated with any of the other independent variables, the variance indicated by the partial residual plot can be much less than the actual variance. These issues are discussed in more detail in the references given below.

== CCPR plot ==
The CCPR (component and component-plus-residual) plot is a refinement of the partial residual plot, adding

$$\hat{\beta}_iX_i \mathrm{\ versus\ } X_i.$$

This is the "component" part of the plot and is intended to show where the "fitted line" would lie.

== See also ==
- Partial regression plot
- Partial leverage plot
- Variance inflation factors for a multi-linear fit.
