= Partial leverage =

In regression analysis, partial leverage (PL) is a measure of the contribution of the individual independent variables to the total leverage of each observation. That is, if h_{i} is the i^{th} element of the diagonal of the hat matrix, PL is a measure of how h_{i} changes as a variable is added to the regression model. It is computed as:

$$\left(\mathrm{PL}_j\right)_i = \frac{\left(X_{j\bullet[j]}\right)_i^2}{\sum_{k=1}^n\left(X_{j\bullet[j]}\right)_k^2}$$

where

j = index of independent variable
i = index of observation
X_{j·[j]} = residuals from regressing X_{j} against the remaining independent variables

Note that the partial leverage is the leverage of the i^{th} point in the partial regression plot for the j^{th} variable. Data points with large partial leverage for an independent variable can exert undue influence on the selection of that variable in automatic regression model building procedures.

== See also ==
- Leverage
- Partial residual plot
- Partial regression plot
- Variance inflation factor for a multi-linear fit
