= Damodar N. Gujarati =

Indian-American Econometrician, author and professor

- Born: 1930 (age 95–96); India
- Citizenship: American

Academic background
- Education: (PhD) University of Chicago (M.Com) University of Mumbai

Academic work
- Discipline: Econometrics
- Institutions: United States Military Academy; Baruch College

Damodar N. Gujarati (born 1930) is an Indian American economist and professor emeritus of economics at the United States Military Academy at West Point, and author/co-author of the Basic Econometrics textbook, among others. The textbook has been published in 5 editions over the last 21 years, and translated into French, Spanish, Portuguese, Korean, Chinese, Turkish, and Persian.

== Education ==
Damodar N Gujarati was born in 1930 in India and completed his graduation in M.Com from the University of Mumbai. He then completed his MBA and his PhD in Economics University of Chicago in US.

== Selected publications ==
=== Books ===
- Gujarati, Damodar N. Basic Econometrics. New York: McGraw-Hill, 1978. ISBN 978-0-07-025182-3 Held in 784 WorldCat libraries
  - Third ed., 1995 (with Dawn C. Porter)
  - fifth ed, 2009 (with Dawn C. Porter)
  - review Journal of Applied Econometrics
  - Gujarati, Damodar N. Essentials of Econometrics. New York: McGraw-Hill, 1992. ISBN 978-0-07-025194-6 (abridged version of Basic Econometrics.)
  - White, Kenneth J., Linda T. M. Bui, and Damodar N. Gujarati. Basic Econometrics; A Computer Handbook Using SHAZAM for Use with Gujarati: Basic Econometrics, Second Edition. New York: McGraw-Hill, 1988.
  - Gujarati, Damodar N. Principios de econometria. Aravaca, Madrid: Mac Graw- Hill interamericana, 2006. Spanish translation)
  - Gujarati, Damodar N. Économétrie. Bruxelles: De Boeck, 2004. (French translation)
  - Gujarati, Damodar N., and Tao Zhang.经济计量学精要 = Jing ji ji liang xue jing yao. Jing ji jiao cai yi cong. Beijing: Ji xie gong ye chu ban she, 2006. (Chinese Translation)
  - Gujarati, Damodar N., Chʻung-yŏng An, Sŏng-pʻyo Hong, and Wan-gyu Pak. 計量經濟學 : 基礎 Kyeryang kyŏngjehak: kichʻo. Sŏul Tʻŭkpyŏlsi: Chinyŏngsa, 1994. (Korean translation)
  - Gujarati, Damodar N., Ümit Şenesen, and Gülay Günlük Şenesen. Temel ekonometri. Literatür Yayınları, 33. İstanbul: Literatür, 2001. (Turkish translation)
  - Gujarati, Damodar N. Econometria básica. São Paulo: Makron Books, 2000.(Portuguese translation)
- Gujarati, Damodar N. Pensions and New York City's Fiscal Crisis. Studies in social security and retirement policy. Washington: American Enterprise Institute for Public Policy Research, 1978. ISBN 978-0-8447-3314-2 (held in 476 worldcat libraries)
- Gujarati, Damodar N. Government and Business. New York: McGraw-Hill, 1984. ISBN 978-0-07-025186-1
