= Alberto Cairo =

Information designer and professor

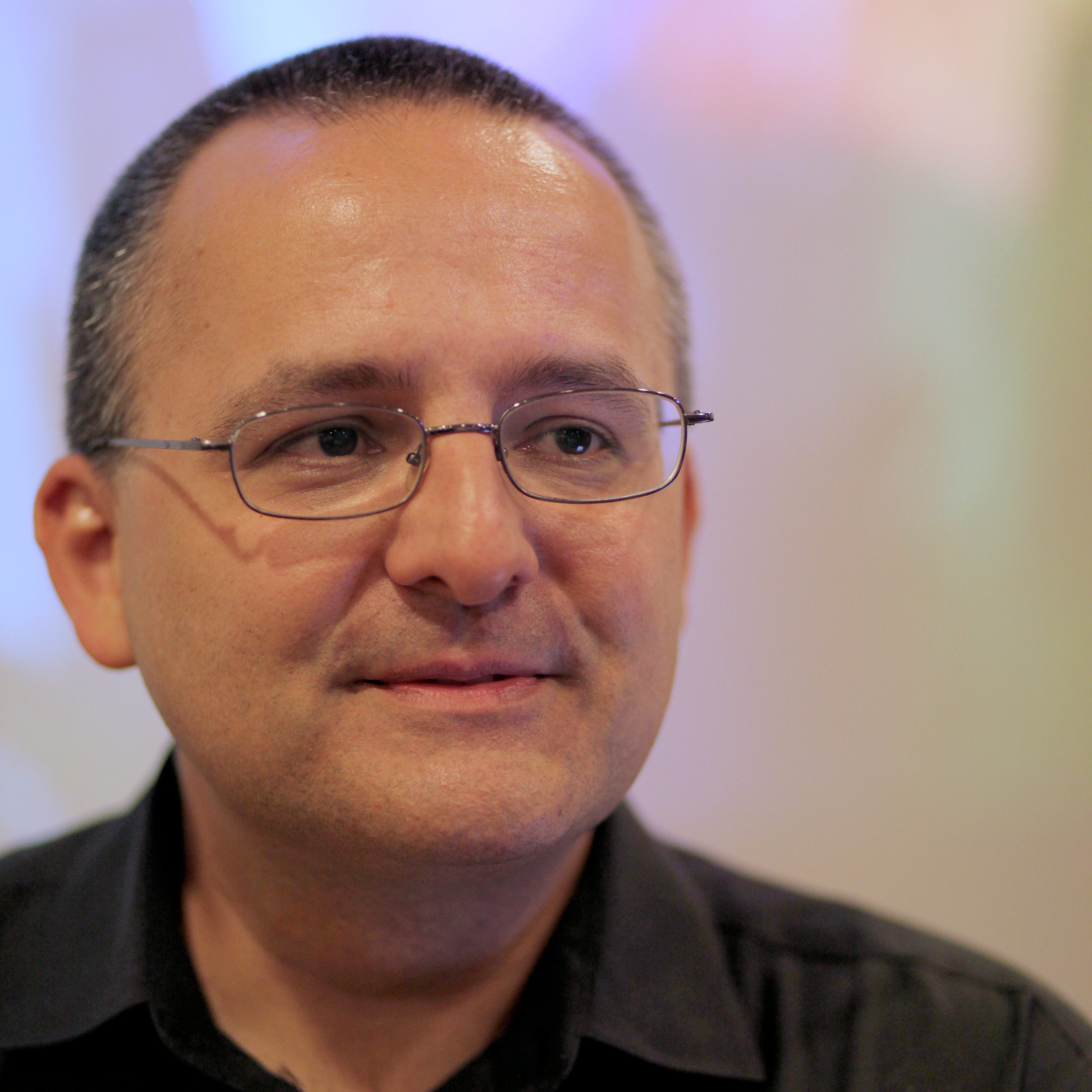
- Born: 1974 (age 51–52); A Coruña, Spain

Academic background
- Education: University of Santiago de Compostela; Universitat Oberta de Catalunya

Academic work
- Discipline: journalism
- Sub-discipline: visual journalism
- Institutions: University of Miami
- Notable works: The Functional Art; The Truthful Art
- Website: http://albertocairo.com/

Alberto Cairo (born 1974 in A Coruña) is a Spanish information designer and professor. Cairo is the Knight Chair in Visual Journalism at the School of Communication of the University of Miami.

== Education ==
Cairo holds a BA in Journalism from the University of Santiago de Compostela, and MA and PhD from the Universitat Oberta de Catalunya (in Barcelona).

== Career ==
Cairo began working as a journalist in the late 1990s, at La Voz de Galicia (The Voice of Galicia), and then at Diario 16 (Diary 16) where he worked on print graphics. He then worked as a data-journalist and information designer at El Mundo, Spain's second largest printed daily newspaper, where he experimented with emerging tools like Macromedia Flash to make multimedia infographics. He became the director of the paper's online component, supervising five people, at a time when very few global newspapers were doing similar graphical work. Notable multimedia articles included the paper's coverage of the September 11 attacks in the US in 2001, and the 2004 Madrid train bombings.

In 2005, Cairo was hired by the University of North Carolina at Chapel Hill to teach Flash, 3D animation, and interactive graphics. He returned to the publishing world in 2007, now based in São Paulo, Brazil, where he worked on graphics for the magazine Época. He was the director for Infographics and Multimedia at Editora Globo in Brazil.

Cairo returned to the world of education in 2012 at the University of Miami. That year, he created the first Massive Open Online Course in journalism, "Introduction to Infographics and Data Visualization," with the Knight Center for Journalism in the Americas. Cairo teaches for the journalism department and the Master of Fine Arts in Interactive Media program, and is the director of the visualization program at the Frost Institute for Data Science and Computing.

In 2016, Cairo designed a dataset that would appear as a dinosaur when visualized, emphasizing to, "Never trust summary statistics alone; always visualize your data". It would end up inspiring the creation of the Datasaurus dozen.

== Books ==
- The Functional Art: an Introduction to Information Graphics and Visualization (2012)
- The Truthful Art: Data, Charts, and Maps for Communication (2016)
- How Charts Lie (2019)
