= Dixon's Q test =

Criterion for identification and rejection of outliers

In statistics, Dixon's Q test, or simply the Q test, is used for identification and rejection of outliers. This assumes normal distribution and per Robert Dean and Wilfrid Dixon, and others, this test should be used sparingly and never more than once in a data set. To apply a Q test for bad data, arrange the data in order of increasing values and calculate Q as defined:

$$Q = \frac{\text{gap}}{\text{range}}$$

Where gap is the absolute difference between the outlier in question and the closest number to it. If Q > Q_{table}, where Q_{table} is a reference value corresponding to the sample size and confidence level, then reject the questionable point. Note that only one point may be rejected from a data set using a Q test.

== Example ==
Consider the data set:

$$0.189,\ 0.167,\ 0.187,\ 0.183,\ 0.186,\ 0.182,\ 0.181,\ 0.184,\ 0.181,\ 0.177 \,$$

Now rearrange in increasing order:

$$0.167,\ 0.177,\ 0.181,\ 0.181,\ 0.182,\ 0.183,\ 0.184,\ 0.186,\ 0.187,\ 0.189 \,$$

We hypothesize that 0.167 is an outlier. Calculate Q:

$$Q=\frac{\text{gap}}{\text{range}} = \frac{|0.177-0.167|}{0.189-0.167}=0.455.$$

With 10 observations and at 90% confidence, Q = 0.455 > 0.412 = Q_{table}, so we conclude 0.167 is indeed an outlier. However, at 95% confidence, Q = 0.455 < 0.466 = Q_{table} 0.167 is not considered an outlier.

McBane notes: Dixon provided related tests intended to search for more than one outlier, but they are much less frequently used than the r_{10} or Q version that is intended to eliminate a single outlier.

== Table ==
This table summarizes the limit values of the two-tailed Dixon's Q test.

Number of values:	3	4	5	6	7	8	9	10
Q_{90%}:	0.941	0.765	0.642	0.560	0.507	0.468	0.437	0.412
Q_{95%}:	0.970	0.829	0.710	0.625	0.568	0.526	0.493	0.466
Q_{99%}:	0.994	0.926	0.821	0.740	0.680	0.634	0.598	0.568

== See also ==
- Grubbs's test for outliers
