= Francesca Chiaromonte =

Italian statistician

Francesca Chiaromonte is an Italian statistician known for her work on statistical genetics and dimensionality reduction. She works at Pennsylvania State University as the Dorothy Foehr Huck and J. Lloyd Huck Chair in Statistics for the Life Sciences, professor of statistics, and director of the Genome Sciences Institute, and in the Institute of Economics of the Sant'Anna School of Advanced Studies in Italy as the scientific coordinator for Economics and Management in the era of Data Science.

== Education and career ==
Chiaromonte earned a laurea in statistics and economist from the Sapienza University of Rome. She completed her Ph.D. in 1996 at the University of Minnesota; her dissertation, A Reduction Paradigm for Multivariate Laws, was supervised by R. Dennis Cook.

She became an assistant professor of statistics at the Pennsylvania State University in 1998.

== Recognition ==
In 2016, Chiaromonte was elected as a Fellow of the American Statistical Association "for outstanding collaborative work in high-throughput biology, contributions to methodology in statistics and bioinformatics, commitment to interdisciplinary research, and leadership in developing training programs at the interface of statistics, computation and the life sciences". She was given the Huck Chair in 2019. She was named to the 2022 class of Fellows of the Institute of Mathematical Statistics, for "outstanding contributions to methodology for the analysis of large, complex and structured data, in particular to the fields of sufficient dimension reduction and envelope model, for outstanding interdisciplinary work in the “Omics” and in the biomedical sciences, and for leadership in interdisciplinary training and mentoring efforts".
