= Dawn C. Porter =

American econometrician

Dawn Cheree Porter is an American expert on business statistics, business analytics, and econometrics, known for her textbooks on these subjects. She is professor of clinical data sciences and operations management in the USC Marshall School of Business, where she directs the master's degree program in business analytics and holds the Fubon Teaching Chair in Business Administration.

== Education and career ==
Porter majored in mathematics at Cornell University, and then went to the New York University Stern School of Business for a master's degree and Ph.D. in statistics.

She worked as an assistant professor at Georgetown University from 2001 to 2006, before moving to the University of Southern California, as assistant professor of clinical data sciences in the USC Marshall School of Business. She was promoted to associate professor in 2011 and full professor in 2017. She has directed the master's program in business analytics under different names since 2013. At USC, she holds the Fubon Teaching Chair in Business Administration. She was recognized by a Marshall Teaching Excellence Award in 2023.

== Books ==
Porter is a coauthor or major contributor to textbooks including:

- Basic Econometrics (with Damodar N. Gujarati, 5th ed., McGraw-Hill, 2009)
- Essentials of Econometrics (with Damodar N. Gujarati, McGraw-Hill, 2009)
- Essentials of Business Statistics (with Richard O'Connell, J. Burdeane Orris, and Bruce Bowerman, 2nd ed., McGraw-Hill, 2007)
- Business Statistics and Analytics in Practice (with Bruce L. Bowerman, Richard O'Connell, Richard T. O'Connell, Emily S. Murphree, and Steven C. Huchendorf, 9th ed., McGraw-Hill, 2018)
