= Breakthrough curve =

A breakthrough curve in adsorption is the course of the effluent adsorptive concentration at the outlet of a fixed bed adsorber. Breakthrough curves are important for adsorptive separation technologies and for the characterization of porous materials.

== Importance ==
Since almost all adsorptive separation processes are dynamic -meaning, that they are running under flow - testing porous materials for those applications for their separation performance has to be tested under flow as well. Since separation processes run with mixtures of different components, measuring several breakthrough curves results in thermodynamic mixture equilibria - mixture sorption isotherms, that are hardly accessible with static manometric sorption characterization. This enables the determination of sorption selectivities in gaseous and liquid phase.

The determination of breakthrough curves is the foundation of many other processes, like the pressure swing adsorption. Within this process, the loading of one adsorber is equivalent to a breakthrough experiment.

== Measurement ==
A fixed bed of porous materials (e.g. activated carbons and zeolites) is pressurized and purged with a carrier gas. After becoming stationary one or more adsorptives are added to the carrier gas, resulting in a step-wise change of the inlet concentration. This is in contrast to chromatographic separation processes, where pulse-wise changes of the inlet concentrations are used. The course of the adsorptive concentrations at the outlet of the fixed bed are monitored.

== Results ==
Integration of the area above the entire breakthrough curve gives the maximum loading of the adsorptive material. Additionally, the duration of the breakthrough experiment until a certain threshold of the adsorptive concentration at the outlet can be measured, which enables the calculation of a technically usable sorption capacity. Up to this time, the quality of the product stream can be maintained. The shape of the breakthrough curves contains information about the mass transfer properties of the adsorptive-adsorbent system. These properties can be evaluated by applying simplified models and fitting to experimental data by simulations.
