= Steven L. Brunton =

American mechanical engineer

Steven L. Brunton is an American mechanical engineer and applied mathematician. He is the Boeing Professor of AI & Data-Driven Engineering at the University of Washington, where his research focuses on applying machine learning to dynamical systems, fluid mechanics, and control theory. He serves as Director of NSF AI Institute in Dynamic Systems, the AI Center for Dynamics and Control (ACDC), and the AI for Engineering Education Institute (AIEEI).

== Education and career ==
Brunton earned a Bachelor of Science degree in mathematics, with a minor in control and dynamical systems, from the California Institute of Technology in 2006. He completed his Ph.D. in mechanical and aerospace engineering at Princeton University in 2012. Following a postdoctoral position in applied mathematics at the University of Washington, he joined the faculty there in 2014, where he is now a full professor.

== Research ==
Brunton’s research combines methods from applied mathematics, machine learning, and physics-based modeling to analyze and control complex systems. His work spans model discovery, reduced-order modeling, sparse sensing, and control, with applications in fluid dynamics, aerospace engineering, energy systems, and neuroscience.

Brunton is noted for developing the Sparse identification of non-linear dynamics (SINDy) algorithm and for his contributions to data-driven modeling in engineering and the physical sciences, specifically in fluid dynamics.

== Awards and honors ==
- Fellow of the American Physical Society (2024)
- Moore Distinguished Scholar, California Institute of Technology (2021–2022)
- Presidential Early Career Award for Scientists and Engineers (PECASE) (2019)

== Books ==
- Brunton, S. L., & Kutz, J. N. Data-Driven Science and Engineering: Machine Learning, Dynamical Systems, and Control. Cambridge University Press, 2019. ISBN 978-1108422093.
- Kutz, J. N., Brunton, S. L., Brunton, B. W., & Proctor, J. L. Dynamic Mode Decomposition: Data-Driven Modeling of Complex Systems. Society for Industrial and Applied Mathematics (SIAM), 2016. ISBN 978-1-61197-449-2.
- Duriez, T., Brunton, S. L., & Noack, B. R. Machine Learning Control: Taming Nonlinear Dynamics and Turbulence. Springer, 2017. DOI: 10.1007/978-3-319-40624-4.
- Mendez, M. A., Ianiro, A., Noack, B. R., & Brunton, S. L. (Eds.). Data-Driven Fluid Mechanics: Combining First Principles and Machine Learning. Cambridge University Press, 2023. DOI: 10.1017/9781108896214.
