= Stepwise =

Stepwise may refer to:

- Stepwise reaction
- Stepwise refinement
- Stepwise regression

== See also ==
- Step function, a mathematical function
