= Complete class theorem =

The Complete class theorems is a class of theorems in decision theory. They establish that all admissible decision rules are equivalent to the Bayesian decision rule for some utility function and some prior distribution (or for the limit of a sequence of prior distributions). Thus, for every decision rule, either the rule may be reformulated as a Bayesian procedure (or a limit of a sequence of such), or there is a rule that is sometimes better and never worse.

For example, Ferguson [section 2.10] gives a theorem establishing that if the sample space is closed and the parameter space is finite then the class of Bayes rules is complete.
