= Linear function =

Linear map or polynomial function of degree one

In mathematics, the term linear function refers to two distinct but related notions:

- In calculus and related areas, a linear function is a function whose graph is a straight line, that is, a polynomial function of degree zero (a constant polynomial) or one (a linear polynomial). For distinguishing such a linear function from the other concept, the term affine function is often used.
- In linear algebra, mathematical analysis, and functional analysis, a linear function is a kind of function between vector spaces.

== As a polynomial function ==
Graphs of two linear functions.

In calculus, analytic geometry and related areas, a linear function is a polynomial of degree one or less, including the zero polynomial. (The latter is a polynomial with no terms, and it is not considered to have degree zero.)

When the function is of only one variable, it is of the form

$$f(x)=ax+b,$$

where a and b are constants, often real numbers. The graph of such a function of one variable is a nonvertical line. a is frequently referred to as the slope of the line, and b as the intercept.

If a > 0 then the gradient is positive and the graph slopes upwards.

If a < 0 then the gradient is negative and the graph slopes downwards.

For a function $f(x_1, \ldots, x_k)$ of any finite number of variables, the general formula is

$$f(x_1, \ldots, x_k) = b + a_1 x_1 + \cdots + a_k x_k ,$$

and the graph is a hyperplane of dimension k.

A constant function is also considered linear in this context, as it is a polynomial of degree zero or is the zero polynomial. Its graph, when there is only one variable, is a horizontal line.

In this context, a function that is also a linear map (the other meaning of linear functions, see below) may be referred to as a homogeneous linear function or a linear form. In the context of linear algebra, the polynomial functions of degree 0 or 1 are the scalar-valued affine maps.

== As a linear map ==
An integral of an integrable function is a linear map from a vector space of integrable functions to real numbers (that is also a vector space).

In linear algebra, a linear function is a map $f$ from a vector space $\mathbf{V}$ to a vector space $\mathbf{W}$ (Both spaces are not necessarily different.) over a same field K such that

$$f(\mathbf{x} + \mathbf{y}) = f(\mathbf{x}) + f(\mathbf{y})$$
$$f(a\mathbf{x}) = af(\mathbf{x}).$$

Here a denotes a constant belonging to the field K of scalars (for example, the real numbers), and x and y are elements of $\mathbf{V}$, which might be K itself. Even if the same symbol $+$ is used, the operation of addition between x and y (belonging to $\mathbf{V}$) is not necessarily same to the operation of addition between $f\left( \mathbf{x} \right)$ and $f\left( \mathbf{y} \right)$ (belonging to $\mathbf{W}$).

In other terms the linear function preserves vector addition and scalar multiplication.

Some authors use "linear function" only for linear maps that take values in the scalar field; these are more commonly called linear forms.

The "linear functions" of calculus qualify as "linear maps" when (and only when) f(0, ..., 0) = 0, or, equivalently, when the constant b equals zero in the one-degree polynomial above. Geometrically, the graph of the function must pass through the origin.

== See also ==
- Homogeneous function
- Nonlinear system
- Piecewise linear function
- Linear approximation
- Linear interpolation
- Discontinuous linear map
- Linear least squares
