= Willard D. James =

American mathematician (1927–2025)

Willard Donald James (June 13, 1927 – May 20, 2025) was an American mathematician most known for his work on the James-Stein estimator.

James graduated from East Aurora High School in 1945, then served in the United States Air Force. Following this, he attended Aurora College and Northern Illinois University. He then received a Ph.D. in mathematics from University of Illinois Urbana-Champaign in 1957 and was recruited to California State University, Long Beach in 1967 from which he retired as a Professor Emeritus in 1987. James died on May 20, 2025, at the age of 97.
