= Admissible decision rule =

Type of "good" decision rule in Bayesian statistics

In statistical decision theory, an admissible decision rule is a rule for making a decision such that there is no other rule that is always "better" than it (or at least sometimes better and never worse), in the precise sense of "better" defined below. This concept is analogous to Pareto efficiency.

== Definition ==
Define sets $\Theta\,$, $\mathcal{X}$ and $\mathcal{A}$, where $\Theta\,$ are the states of nature, $\mathcal{X}$ the possible observations, and $\mathcal{A}$ the actions that may be taken. An observation of $x \in \mathcal{X}\,\!$ is distributed as $F(x\mid\theta)\,\!$ and therefore provides evidence about the state of nature $\theta\in\Theta\,\!$. A decision rule is a function $\delta:{\mathcal{X}}\rightarrow {\mathcal{A}}$, where upon observing $x\in \mathcal{X}$, we choose to take action $\delta(x)\in \mathcal{A}\,\!$.

Also define a loss function $L: \Theta \times \mathcal{A} \rightarrow \mathbb{R}$, which specifies the loss we would incur by taking action $a \in \mathcal{A}$ when the true state of nature is $\theta \in \Theta$. Usually we will take this action after observing data $x \in \mathcal{X}$, so that the loss will be $L(\theta,\delta(x))\,\!$. (It is possible though unconventional to recast the following definitions in terms of a utility function, which is the negative of the loss.)

Define the risk function as the expectation

$$R(\theta,\delta)=\operatorname{E}_{F(x\mid\theta)}[{L(\theta,\delta(x))]}.\,\!$$

Whether a decision rule $\delta\,\!$ has low risk depends on the true state of nature $\theta\,\!$. A decision rule $\delta^*\,\!$ dominates a decision rule $\delta\,\!$ if and only if $R(\theta,\delta^*)\le R(\theta,\delta)$ for all $\theta\,\!$, and the inequality is strict for some $\theta\,\!$.

A decision rule is admissible (with respect to the loss function) if and only if no other rule dominates it; otherwise it is inadmissible. Thus an admissible decision rule is a maximal element with respect to the above partial order. An inadmissible rule is not preferred (except for reasons of simplicity or computational efficiency), since by definition there is some other rule that will achieve equal or lower risk for all $\theta\,\!$. But just because a rule $\delta\,\!$ is admissible does not mean it is a good rule to use. Being admissible means there is no other single rule that is always as good or better – but other admissible rules might achieve lower risk for most $\theta\,\!$ that occur in practice. (The Bayes risk discussed below is a way of explicitly considering which $\theta\,\!$ occur in practice.)

== Bayes rules and generalized Bayes rules ==
=== Bayes rules ===
Let $\pi(\theta)\,\!$ be a probability distribution on the states of nature. From a Bayesian point of view, we would regard it as a prior distribution. That is, it is our believed probability distribution on the states of nature, prior to observing data. For a frequentist, it is merely a function on $\Theta\,\!$ with no such special interpretation. The Bayes risk of the decision rule $\delta\,\!$ with respect to $\pi(\theta)\,\!$ is the expectation

$$r(\pi,\delta)=\operatorname{E}_{\pi(\theta)}[R(\theta,\delta)].\,\!$$

A decision rule $\delta\,\!$ that minimizes $r(\pi,\delta)\,\!$ is called a Bayes rule with respect to $\pi(\theta)\,\!$. There may be more than one such Bayes rule. If the Bayes risk is infinite for all $\delta\,\!$, then no Bayes rule is defined.

=== Generalized Bayes rules ===
In the Bayesian approach to decision theory, the observed $x\,\!$ is considered fixed. Whereas the frequentist approach (i.e., risk) averages over possible samples $x \in \mathcal{X}\,\!$, the Bayesian would fix the observed sample $x\,\!$ and average over hypotheses $\theta \in \Theta\,\!$. Thus, the Bayesian approach is to consider for our observed $x\,\!$ the expected loss

$$\rho(\pi,\delta \mid x)=\operatorname{E}_{\pi(\theta \mid x)} [ L(\theta,\delta(x)) ]. \,\!$$

where the expectation is over the posterior of $\theta\,\!$ given $x\,\!$ (obtained from $\pi(\theta)\,\!$ and $F(x\mid\theta)\,\!$ using Bayes' theorem).

Having made explicit the expected loss for each given $x\,\!$ separately, we can define a decision rule $\delta\,\!$ by specifying for each $x\,\!$ an action $\delta(x)\,\!$ that minimizes the expected loss. This is known as a generalized Bayes rule with respect to $\pi(\theta)\,\!$. There may be more than one generalized Bayes rule, since there may be multiple choices of $\delta(x)\,\!$ that achieve the same expected loss.

At first, this may appear rather different from the Bayes rule approach of the previous section, not a generalization. However, notice that the Bayes risk already averages over $\Theta\,\!$ in Bayesian fashion, and the Bayes risk may be recovered as the expectation over $\mathcal{X}$ of the expected loss (where $x\sim\theta\,\!$ and $\theta\sim\pi\,\!$). Roughly speaking, $\delta\,\!$ minimizes this expectation of expected loss (i.e., is a Bayes rule) if and only if it minimizes the expected loss for each $x \in \mathcal{X}$ separately (i.e., is a generalized Bayes rule).

Then why is the notion of generalized Bayes rule an improvement? It is indeed equivalent to the notion of Bayes rule when a Bayes rule exists and all $x\,\!$ have positive probability. However, no Bayes rule exists if the Bayes risk is infinite (for all $\delta\,\!$). In this case it is still useful to define a generalized Bayes rule $\delta\,\!$, which at least chooses a minimum-expected-loss action $\delta(x)\!\,$ for those $x\,\!$ for which a finite-expected-loss action does exist. In addition, a generalized Bayes rule may be desirable because it must choose a minimum-expected-loss action $\delta(x)\,\!$ for every $x\,\!$, whereas a Bayes rule would be allowed to deviate from this policy on a set $X \subseteq \mathcal{X}$ of measure 0 without affecting the Bayes risk.

More important, it is sometimes convenient to use an improper prior $\pi(\theta)\,\!$. In this case, the Bayes risk is not even well-defined, nor is there any well-defined distribution over $x\,\!$. However, the posterior $\pi(\theta\mid x)\,\!$—and hence the expected loss—may be well-defined for each $x\,\!$, so that it is still possible to define a generalized Bayes rule.

=== Admissibility of (generalized) Bayes rules ===
According to the complete class theorems, under mild conditions every admissible rule is a (generalized) Bayes rule (with respect to some prior $\pi(\theta)\,\!$—possibly an improper one—that favors distributions $\theta\,\!$ where that rule achieves low risk). Thus, in frequentist decision theory it is sufficient to consider only (generalized) Bayes rules.

Conversely, while Bayes rules with respect to proper priors are virtually always admissible, generalized Bayes rules corresponding to improper priors need not yield admissible procedures. Stein's example is one such famous situation.

== Examples ==
The James–Stein estimator is a nonlinear estimator of the mean of Gaussian random vectors and can be shown to dominate the ordinary least squares technique with respect to a mean-squared-error loss function. Thus least squares estimation is not an admissible estimation procedure in this context. Some others of the standard estimates associated with the normal distribution are also inadmissible: for example, the sample estimate of the variance when the population mean and variance are unknown.
