= Dominating decision rule =

Rule that is never worse and sometimes better

In decision theory, a decision rule is said to dominate another if the performance of the former is sometimes better, and never worse, than that of the latter.

Formally, let $\delta_1$ and $\delta_2$ be two decision rules, and let $R(\theta, \delta)$ be the risk of rule $\delta$ for parameter $\theta$. The decision rule $\delta_1$ is said to dominate the rule $\delta_2$ if $R(\theta,\delta_1)\le R(\theta,\delta_2)$ for all $\theta$, and the inequality is strict for some $\theta$.

This defines a partial order on decision rules; the maximal elements with respect to this order are called admissible decision rules.
