= Pocs =

Pocs, POCs or POCS may refer to:

== Hungarian people ==
- Éva Pócs (born 1936), Hungarian anthropologist
- János Pócs (born 1963), Hungarian politician
- Péter Pócs (born 1950), Hungarian artist
- Pócs, the taxonomic author abbreviation for Hungarian botanist Tamás Pócs (born 1933)

== Other uses ==
- Palace of Culture and Science, Warsaw, tallest building in Poland and an icon of Warsaw
- Piner Olivet Charter School, school in California, United States
- Posterior Circulation Stroke Syndrome (POCS), related to Posterior circulation infarct
- Projections onto convex sets (POCS)
- Persons/ People of Colour(s)
