= Ronald Fedkiw =

American mathematician

- Born: February 27, 1968 (age 58); Buffalo, New York, US
- Education: UCLA (Ph.D., 1996)
- Known for: Physics-based techniques for visual simulations
- Awards: National Academy of Sciences, 80th Academy Awards, 87th Academy Awards
- Scientific career
- Fields: Computer graphics, Computer vision, Machine learning, Computational physics
- Workplaces: Stanford University (2000-)
- Doctoral advisor: Stanley Osher

Ronald Paul "Ron" Fedkiw (born February 27, 1968) is a full professor in the Stanford University department of computer science and a leading researcher in the field of computer graphics, focusing on topics relating to physically based simulation of natural phenomena and machine learning. His techniques have been employed in many motion pictures. He has earned recognition at the 80th Academy Awards and the 87th Academy Awards as well as from the National Academy of Sciences.

His first Academy Award was awarded for developing techniques that enabled many technically sophisticated adaptations including the visual effects in 21st century movies in the Star Wars, Harry Potter, Terminator, and Pirates of the Caribbean franchises. Fedkiw has designed a platform that has been used to create many of the movie world's most advanced special effects since it was first used on the T-X character in Terminator 3: Rise of the Machines. His second Academy Award was awarded for computer graphics techniques for special effects for large scale destruction. Although he has won an Oscar for his work, he does not design the visual effects that use his technique. Instead, he has developed a system that other award-winning technicians and engineers have used to create visual effects for some of the world's most expensive and highest-grossing movies.

== Early life and family ==
Fedkiw was born in Buffalo, New York, in 1968. He received his Ph.D. in applied mathematics from UCLA in 1996. His dissertation was chaired by Stanley Osher. He completed postdoctoral studies both at UCLA in Mathematics and at Caltech in Aeronautics before joining the Stanford Computer Science Department. Fedkiw has two daughters: Brittany and Briana.

== Career ==
Fedkiw began working in the movie industry in 1998 on 3-D water simulations using Navier-Stokes equations.

Fedkiw is now a full professor in the department of computer science at Stanford where he researches computational physics. Fedkiw serves on the editorial boards of Journal of Computational Physics and the Journal of Scientific Computing. He has published Level Set Methods and Dynamic Implicit Surfaces (Springer 2002, ISBN 0-387-95482-1) along with Stanley Osher.

Since 2000, Fedkiw has been a consultant with Industrial Light & Magic receiving screen credits for work on Terminator 3: Rise of the Machines, Star Wars: Episode III – Revenge of the Sith and Poseidon. In addition, he has worked on all three Pirates of the Caribbean and some Harry Potter movies. Fedkiw's techniques have made possible the renderings of the sea in the Pirates movies and the dragon's flaming breath in Harry Potter and the Goblet of Fire. They have also made possible the rushing floodwaters in Evan Almighty and were first used with T-X in Terminator 3. Fedkiw feels the best result of the use of his techniques was the sinking ship shots in Poseidon. Pirates of the Caribbean: Dead Man's Chest won the Academy Award for Visual Effects at the 79th Academy Awards awarded on February 25, 2007, and Poseidon was also nominated that year in that category. Among the applications that Fedkiw's math engine is responsible for is the tentacles of Davy Jones (pictured left) in the Academy Award-winning Dead Man's Chest.

On February 9, 2008, in the Academy Scientific and Technical Award ceremony at the Beverly Wilshire Hotel in Beverly Hills, California, Fedkiw was awarded an 80th Academy Award for Technical Achievement for the development of the Industrial Light & Magic (ILM) fluid simulation system. He shared the award with Nick Rasmussen and Frank Losasso Petterson. Fedkiw does physics-based simulation that enable better water effects. Previous representations had varying levels of success. They often did well at surface representation, but were less efficient at smaller particles such as breaking waves. Fedkiw's team's innovative "particle level set method" allows both smooth surfaces and water breakdown renderings including water spray. Fedkiw has worked with Industrial Light & Magic, Pixar Animation Studios, Intel Corporation, Honda and Sony Pictures Imageworks. Fedkiw commented that when he was informed that he would be presented his award by Jessica Alba he was quoted by the Associated Press as follows: "They said I got 60 seconds so I might just spend the last 15 realizing I'm 10 feet away from the most beautiful woman on the planet . . . and no restraining order this time.". On February 7, 2015, he received a second Academy Scientific and Technical Award for the development of the ILM PhysBAM Destruction System.

Fedkiw and his colleagues have designed a C++ code library for Physics Based Modelling (PhysBAM http://physbam.stanford.edu) that facilitates the creation of better special effects for movies, including water, smoke, fire, cloth, rigid bodies and deformable bodies. Fedkiw often receives screen credit for consulting with special effects engineers, technicians and movie executives. His research has focused on the design of new computational algorithms that can be used for many purposes, including computational fluid dynamics and soft-body dynamics, computer graphics, computer vision and computational biomechanics. In fact, the system can also be used for a range of applications from motion capture to rendering, but Fedkiw's main emphasis is on physics-based simulation.

Fedkiw has described his work as follows:

It is an exhaustive task to prescribe the motion of every degree of freedom in a piece of clothing or a crashing wave. . .Since these motions are governed by physical processes, it can be difficult to make these phenomena appear natural. Thus, physically based simulation has become quite popular in the special effects industry. The same class of tools useful for computational fluid dynamics is also useful for sinking a ship on the big screen.

== Awards ==
- Presidential Early Career Award for Scientists and Engineers
- National Academy of Sciences: Award for Initiatives in Research
- SIGGRAPH: Significant New Researcher Award (2005)
- Academy Award: Scientific and Technical Award (2015)

== Book ==
- S. Osher and R. Fedkiw, Level Set Methods and Dynamic Implicit Surfaces, Springer-Verlag, New York (2002).

== See also ==
- Industrial Light & Magic
- Level-set method
