= Bregman Lagrangian =

Optimization method in numerical analysis

The Bregman-Lagrangian framework permits a systematic understanding of the matching rates associated with higher-order gradient methods in discrete and continuous time. Based on Bregman divergence, the Lagrangian is a continuous time dynamical system whose Euler-Lagrange equations can be linked to Nesterov's accelerated gradient method for gradient-based optimization. The associated Bregman Hamiltonian allows for practical implementation of numerical discretizations. The approach has been generalized to optimization on Riemannian manifolds.
