= Leonid Rudin =

American computer scientist

- Education: MSci. & PhD. (Computer Science & Computational Imaging Science
- Alma mater: California Institute of Technology (Caltech)
- Occupation: Computer Scientist
- Known for: Co-founder and CEO of Cognitech

Leonid Rudin is an American computer scientist known as the co-founder and CEO of Cognitech. He is one of the leaders in the Forensic Video Image processing field.

== Education ==
Rudin holds an MSci. and PhD., degrees in Computer Science and Computational Imaging Science from California Institute of Technology (Caltech).

== Career ==
Rudin has worked in the computer software industry for decades. He pioneered Total Variation Minimization approach in Image Processing and Analysis.

Rudin is the first author of a highly cited original paper in image processing. He is the co-founder of Forensic Video Processing and 360 Forensic Photogrammetry fields. Between 1989 and 2008, he served as "Principal R&D Investigator" for Defense Advanced Project Agency (DARPA). In 1992, he co-authored and co-designed the first commercial Forensic Video software known as "Video Investigator".

In 1988, Rudin co-founded Cognitech, a company that develops forensic video enhancement software & hardware. Between 2000 and 2008, he served as "Principal R&D Investigator" for National Geospatial-Intelligence Agency (NGA).

Rudin has several USPTO Patents. He is a member of professional associations such Institute of Electrical and Electronics Engineers (IEEE), American Academy of Forensic Science (AAFS), and American Society for Photogrammetry and Remote Sensing (ASPRS).

== Awards and honors ==
Rudin is the winner of 2010 American Technology Award for PiX2GPS and the winner of DePrima Mathematics Applications Award.

== See also ==
- Stanley Osher
- Total variation denoising
