= Rosa Donat =

Spanish applied mathematician

Rosa María Donat Beneito (born 1960) is a Spanish applied mathematician whose research involves numerical methods for partial differential equations, particularly multiresolution methods for problems modeling fluid dynamics with shock waves or with high Mach number. She is a professor of applied mathematics and vice rector for innovation and transfer at the University of Valencia, and former president of the Spanish Society of Applied Mathematics.

== Education and career ==
Donat was born in 1960 in La Font de la Figuera. After earning a degree in mathematal sciences from the University of Valencia in 1984, she traveled to the University of California, Los Angeles in 1985 as a Fulbright Scholar, earning a master's degree there in 1987 and a Ph.D. in mathematics in 1990. Her doctoral dissertation, Studies on Error Propagation Into Regions of Smoothness for Certain Nonlinear Approximations to Hyperbolic Equations, was supervised by Stanley Osher.

She has held a tenured position at the University of Valencia since 1993, and was given a professorial chair there in 2008.

She was elected as president of the Spanish Society of Applied Mathematics in 2016, becoming the society's first woman president and holding office from 2016 to 2020.
