= Proximal operator =

Function in mathematical optimization

In mathematical optimization, the proximal operator is an operator associated with a proper, (Note: An (extended) real-valued function f on a Hilbert space is said to be proper if it is not identically equal to $+\infty$, and $-\infty$ is not in its image.) lower semi-continuous convex function $f$ from a Hilbert space $\mathcal{X}$ to $[-\infty,+\infty]$, and is defined by:

$$\operatorname{prox}_f(v) = \arg \min_{x\in\mathcal{X}} \left(f(x) + \frac 1 2 \|x - v\|_\mathcal{X}^2\right).$$

For any function in this class, the minimizer of the right-hand side above is unique, hence making the proximal operator well-defined. The proximal operator is used in proximal gradient methods, which is frequently used in optimization algorithms associated with non-differentiable optimization problems such as total variation denoising.

== Properties ==
The $\text{prox}$ of a proper, lower semi-continuous convex function $f$ enjoys several useful properties for optimization.

- Fixed points of $\text{prox}_f$ are minimizers of $f$: $\{x\in \mathcal{X}\ |\ \text{prox}_fx = x\} = \arg \min f$.
- Global convergence to a minimizer is defined as follows: If $\arg \min f \neq \varnothing$, then for any initial point $x_0 \in \mathcal{X}$, the recursion $(\forall n \in \mathbb{N})\quad x_{n+1} = \text{prox}_f x_n$ yields convergence $x_n \to x \in \arg \min f$ as $n \to +\infty$. This convergence may be weak if $\mathcal{X}$ is infinite dimensional.
- The proximal operator can be seen as a generalization of the projection operator. Indeed, in the specific case where $f$ is the 0-$\infty$ characteristic function $\iota_C$ of a nonempty, closed, convex set $C$ we have that

$$\begin{align}
\operatorname{prox}_{\iota_C}(x)
&= \operatorname{argmin}\limits_y
\begin{cases}
\frac{1}{2} \left\| x-y \right\|_2^2 &  \text{if } y \in C \\
+ \infty                             &  \text{if } y \notin C
\end{cases} \\
&=\operatorname{argmin}\limits_{y \in C} \frac{1}{2} \left\| x-y \right\|_2^2
\end{align}$$
showing that the proximity operator is indeed a generalisation of the projection operator.

- The proximal operator is firmly non-expansive: $(\forall (x,y) \in \mathcal{X}^2) \quad \|\text{prox}_fx - \text{prox}_fy\|^2 \leq \langle x-y\ , \text{prox}_fx - \text{prox}_fy\rangle$.
- The proximal operator of a function is related to the gradient of the Moreau envelope $M_{\lambda f}$ of a function $\lambda f$ by the following identity: $\nabla M_{\lambda f}(x) = \frac{1}{\lambda} (x - \mathrm{prox}_{\lambda f}(x))$.
- The proximity operator of $f$ is characterized by inclusion $p=\operatorname{prox}_f(x) \Leftrightarrow x-p \in \partial f(p)$, where $\partial f$ is the subdifferential of $f$, given by

$\partial f(x) = \{ u \in \mathbb{R}^N \mid \forall y \in \mathbb{R}^N, (y-x)^\mathrm{T}u+f(x) \leq f(y)\}$ In particular, If $f$ is differentiable then the above equation reduces to $p=\operatorname{prox}_f(x) \Leftrightarrow x-p = \nabla f(p)$.

== See also ==
- Proximal gradient method
