= Journal of Scientific Computing =

- Discipline: Scientific computing
- Language: English
- Edited by: Chi-Wang Shu

Publication details
- History: 1986—present
- Publisher: Springer
- Frequency: Quarterly
- Impact factor: 3.3 (2024)

Standard abbreviations
- ISO 4: J. Sci. Comput.

Indexing
- ISSN: 0885-7474 (print); 1573-7691 (web)

Links
- Journal homepage; Online access; Online archive

Journal of Scientific Computing is a peer-reviewed scientific journal published quarterly by Springer Science+Business Media. Established in 1986, it covers developments in scientific computing and its applications in science and engineering. Its current editor-in-chief is Chi-Wang Shu (Brown University).

== Abstracting and indexing ==
The journal is abstracted and indexed in:

- EBSCO databases
- Ei Compendex
- Inspec
- MathSciNet
- ProQuest databases
- Science Citation Index Expanded
- Scopus
- zbMATH Open

According to the Journal Citation Reports, the journal has a 2024 impact factor of 3.3.
