= Yingda Cheng =

Chinese-American applied mathematician

Yingda Cheng (Chinese: 程颖达, born 1983) is a Chinese-American applied mathematician specializing in scientific computation and numerical analysis, including Galerkin methods for the computational solution of differential equations and the simulation of nonlinear optics and plasma physics. She is a professor of mathematics at Virginia Tech.

== Education and career ==
Cheng is originally from Hefei, where she was born in 1983. She graduated from the University of Science and Technology of China in 2003, and earned a master's degree in applied mathematics at Brown University in 2004. She completed her Ph.D. at Brown in 2007. Her dissertation, Discontinuous Galerkin Methods for Hamilton–Jacobi Equations and Equations with Higher Order Derivatives, was supervised by Chi-Wang Shu.

After postdoctoral research with Irene M. Gamba at the University of Texas at Austin, she joined Michigan State University as an assistant professor of mathematics in 2011. She was promoted to associate professor in 2016 and full professor in 2021. In 2023 she was the Knut and Alice Wallenberg Foundation Visiting Professor at Uppsala University in Sweden, and moved to her present position as a professor of mathematics at Virginia Tech, affiliated with the Computational Modeling & Data Analytic Program.

== Recognition ==
Cheng was the 2023 recipient of the Germund Dahlquist Prize of the Society for Industrial and Applied Mathematics, in recognition of her research "on discontinuous Galerkin methods, including structure preservation and sparse grid methods for kinetic and transport equations".
