= Chiu-Yen Kao =

Taiwanese-American applied mathematician

Chiu-Yen Kao (born 1974) is a Taiwanese-American applied mathematician specializing in shape optimization, image segmentation, and mathematical biology. She is a professor of mathematics at Claremont McKenna College.

== Education and career ==
Kao comes from a traditional family which did not support her in pursuing higher education; however, she was encouraged by her professors in continuing her studies. She graduated in 1997 from National Taiwan University with a bachelor's degree in mathematics and a minor in physics. She earned a master's degree in applied mechanics in 1999 from the same university. In 2004 she completed her Ph.D. in mathematics from the University of California, Los Angeles. Her dissertation, Fast sweeping methods for static Hamilton-Jacobi equations, was supervised by Stanley Osher.

After working as a postdoctoral researcher at the Institute for Mathematics and its Applications of the University of Minnesota, she joined the mathematics faculty of the Ohio State University in 2006. She visited Claremont McKenna in 2011–2012 and took a permanent position there in 2012.

== Book ==
With Avner Friedman, Kao is a co-author of the book Mathematical Modeling of Biological Processes (Springer, 2014).
