= Fengyan Li =

Applied mathematician

Fengyan Li is an applied mathematician. She specializes in numerical analysis and scientific computing, and especially in Galerkin methods for magnetohydrodynamics and related problems in computational fluid dynamics including Maxwell's equations and Eikonal equations. Educated in China and the US, she works in the US as a professor of applied mathematics at the Rensselaer Polytechnic Institute.

== Education and career ==
Li was a student at Peking University, where she received a bachelor's degree in 1997 and a master's degree in 2000. Next, she came to Brown University for doctoral study in mathematics, and completed her Ph.D. in 2004. Her dissertation, On Locally Divergence-Free Discontinuous Galerkin Methods, was supervised by Chi-Wang Shu.

After postdoctoral research at the University of South Carolina, Li joined the Rensselaer Polytechnic Institute in 2006. She received a Sloan Research Fellowship in 2008, and a National Science Foundation CAREER Award in 2009.

== Recognition ==
The Association for Women in Mathematics named Li to their 2025 Class of AWM Fellows, "for her continuous and enduring contribution to the promotion of women in computational mathematics through her service to AWM, mentorship of young women scientists, and development of training opportunities as well as platforms for women to connect such as WINASc.".

Li was named as a SIAM Fellow, in the 2026 class of fellows, "for contributions to structure-preserving discontinuous Galerkin methods and other schemes for hyperbolic equations, and for professional services including those to SIAM and women in mathematics".
