= Chi-Wang Shu =

American fluid dynamicist (born 1957)

- Born: January 1, 1957 (age 69); Nanchang, Jiangxi, China
- Education: University of Science and Technology of China (B.S., 1982); University of California at Los Angeles (Ph.D., 1986)
- Known for: TVD temporal discretization ENO and WENO schemes Discontinuous Galerkin method
- Awards: Feng Kang Prize of Scientific Computing (1995)
- Scientific career
- Fields: Applied Mathematics
- Workplaces: Brown University
- Doctoral advisor: Stanley Osher
- Doctoral students: Yingda Cheng; Fengyan Li

Chi-Wang Shu (Chinese: 舒其望, born 1 January 1957) is the Theodore B. Stowell University Professor of Applied Mathematics at Brown University. He is known for his research in the fields of computational fluid dynamics, numerical solutions of conservation laws and Hamilton–Jacobi type equations. Shu has been listed as an ISI Highly Cited Author in Mathematics by the ISI Web of Knowledge.

== Career ==
He received his B.S. in Mathematics from the University of Science and Technology of China, Hefei, in 1982 and his Ph.D. in Mathematics from the University of California at Los Angeles in 1986. His Ph.D. thesis advisor was Stanley Osher.

He started his academic career in 1987 as an assistant professor in the Division of Applied Mathematics at Brown University. He was an associate professor from 1992 to 1996 and became full professor in 1996.

== Honors and awards ==
- He is the 2021 recipient of the John von Neumann Lecture Prize, the highest honor and flagship lecture of Society for Industrial and Applied Mathematics (SIAM). The prize recognizes his fundamental contributions to the numerical solution of partial differential equations: "His work on finite difference essentially non-oscillatory (ENO) methods, weighted ENO (WENO) methods, finite element discontinuous Galerkin methods, and spectral methods has had a major impact on scientific computing."
- The Association for Women in Mathematics has included him in the 2020 class of AWM Fellows for "his exceptional dedication and contribution to mentoring, supporting, and advancing women in the mathematical sciences; for his incredible role in supervising many women Ph.D.s, bringing them into the world of research to which he has made fundamental contributions, and nurturing their professional success".
- In 2012 he became a fellow of the American Mathematical Society.
- In 2009, he was selected as one of the first 183 Fellows of the Society for Industrial and Applied Mathematics (SIAM).
- SIAM/ACM Prize in Computational Science and Engineering (SIAM/ACM CSE Prize), 2007. He received the prize "for the development of numerical methods that have had a great impact on scientific computing, including TVD temporal discretizations, ENO and WENO finite difference schemes, discontinuous Galerkin methods, and spectral methods."
- Feng Kang Prize of Scientific Computing by the Chinese Academy of Sciences, 1995
- NASA Public Service Group Achievement Award for Pioneering Work in Computational Fluid Dynamics by NASA Langley Research Center, 1992
