= Péter Pócs =

Hungarian graphic designer and poster artist

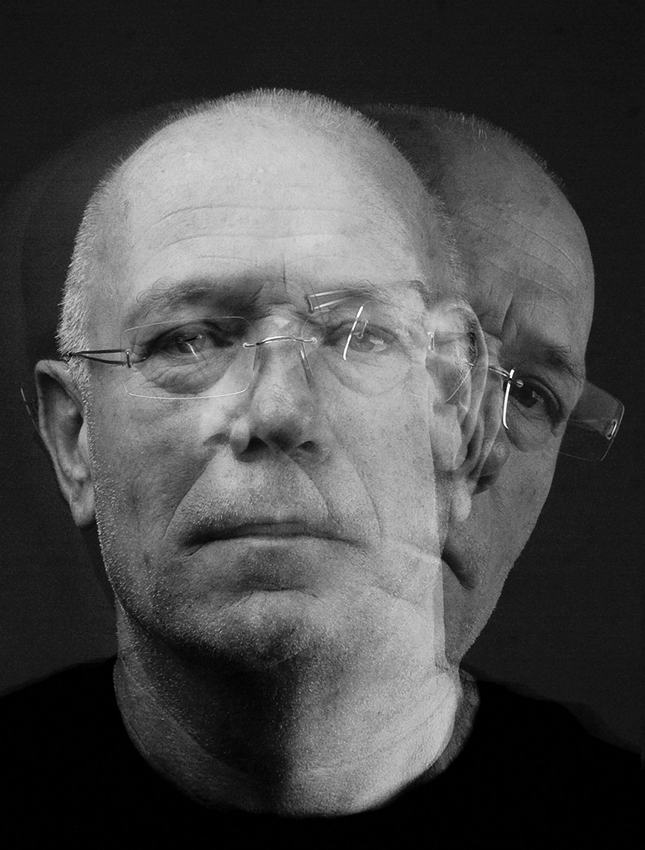
- Born: 14 September 1950 (age 76); Pécs, Hungary
- Education: University of West Hungary
- Occupations: Poster artist, graphic designer

Péter Pócs (born 14 September 1950) is a Hungarian graphic designer and poster artist.

== Life ==
Pócs was born in Pécs on 14 September 1950. He studied at the Art School of Pécs to become a metalworker and earned his high school diploma there in 1971. He began working as a graphic designer in 1972, creating theatre, exhibition and festival posters, and broadening his repertoire with political and social ones from 1989. His sole commercial client was cheese salesman, Tamás T. Nagy, and his mentors were Henryk Tomaszewski, Waldemar Świerzy and György Konecsni. Pócs later earned his university diploma in product design at the University of West Hungary in 2010. His posters of unique, molded, painted clay structures are unmistakable. He often participates in international poster symposiums and regularly shows his works at international exhibitions, biennials and triennials. He founded DOPP Artist Group in 1987, and has been working in his studio, POSTER'V Design since 1991. He also co-founded the Hungarian Poster Association in 2004, of which he was the first president until leaving, then launched his "Hungarian Poster Loneliness Association" in 2008, of which he is a "forever member".

== Works ==
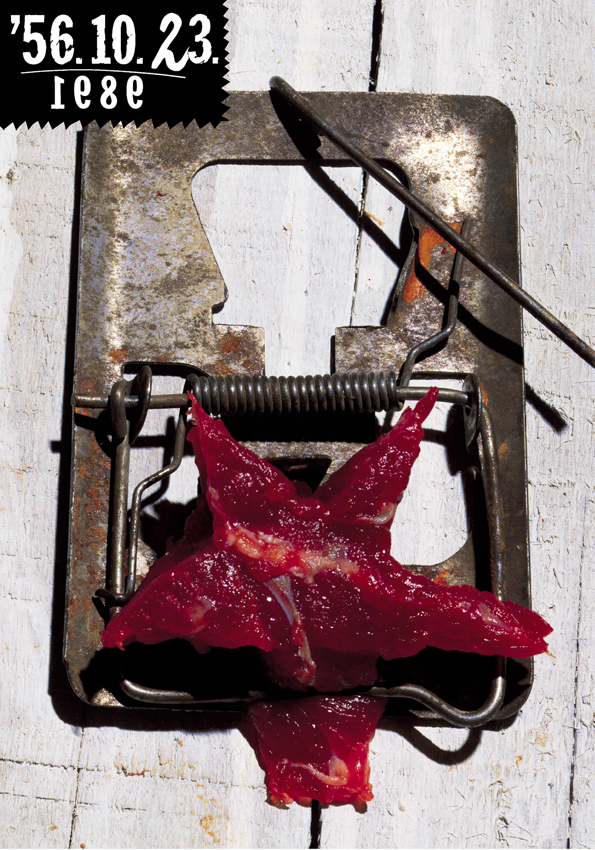
'56.10.23. by Péter Pócs, 1989

=== Solo exhibitions ===
- 1985 – Duna Gallery, Budapest
- 1987 – Stedelijk Museum Amsterdam
- 1987 – Academy of Fine Art, Stuttgart
- 1987 – Dorottya Street Exhibition Space, Budapest
- 1987 – Poster Museum, (DOPP), Lahti (SF)
- 1988 – Town Hall Gallery, Castelmoron-d'Albret
- 1989 – Burg Gallery, Halle
- 1990 – Pécs Gallery, Pécs
- 1990 – Vigadó Gallery, Budapest
- 1992 – La Grange de Dorigny, Lausanne
- 1992 – Obenbare Bibliothek, Amsterdam
- 1994 – Frontenac Gallery, Montreal
- 1994 – Jan Koniarek Gallery, Trnava
- 1994 – Piccolo Teatro Perempruner, Turin
- 1994 – Painters' Hall, Sopron
- 1995 – House of Art, Szekszárd
- 1996 – Knights' Hall of Gyula Castle, Gyula
- 1996 – Ginza Graphic Art Gallery (DOPP), Tokyo
- 1997 – Haus Ungarn, Berlin
- 1997 – City Cultural Center, Szolnok
- 1997 – György Konecsni Museum, Kiskunmajsa
- 1998 – Palace of Culture, Târgu Mureș
- 1999 – Pod Jaszczurami, Kraków
- 2000 – Haus Ungarn, Prague
- 2000 – PSVMK Gallery, Győr
- 2001 – Town Gallery, Štúrovo
- 2001 – Komédium Theater, Budapest
- 2001 – Danish Poster Museum, Aarhus
- 2001 – Casa del Poeta, Mexico City
- 2002 – Polish Institute, Budapest
- 2002 – Universidad La Salle DF, Mexico City
- 2002 – Casa de Cultura del Ayuntamiento Metepec, Edo. de Mexico
- 2002 – Universidad Autónoma de Guanajuato, Guanajuato
- 2003 – Hegyvidéki Contemporary Gallery, Budapest
- 2003 – Søndermølle, Viborg
- 2003 – Salas del exConvento del Carmen, Guadalajara
- 2003 – Instituto de Artes Plásticas U.V., Xalapa
- 2003 – Town Hall Gallery, Castelmoron d'Albret
- 2003 – The Croat Theater, Pécs
- 2004 – Vaerket, Randers
- 2004 – Gallery "Maysterina", Kyiv
- 2006 – Budapest Gallery, Budapest
- 2006 – University Gallery, Xalapa
- 2009 – Town Hall (Ducki, Orosz, Pócs), Aarhus
- 2009 – Stifts Museum (Ducki, Orosz, Pócs), Viborg
- 2011 – Museion No. 1, Budapest
- 2013 – Gheorghe Sincai County Library, Oradea
- 2014 – National Gallery of Arts, Tirana
- 2014 – 13th International Image Festival, Manizales
- 2016 – National Gallery of Kosovo, Pristina
- 2022 – Fészek Gallery, Budapest
- 2023 – National Art Academy, Sofia
- 2023 – National Art Academy, Burgas
- 2024 - "Átokplakátok", FUGA, Budapest
- 2024 - "Pócs plakátok", ARTE Gallery and Auction House, Budapest
- 2024 - "Pócs Plakátok", University of Rzeszow
- 2025 - Pócs 75, Fernando Violches Galéria, Xalapa

=== Workshops, talks ===
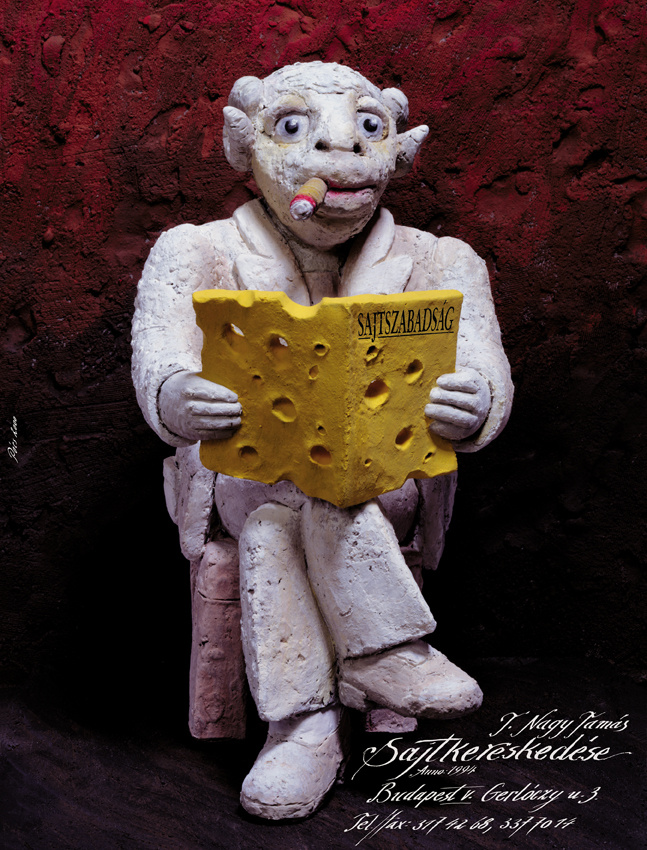
Poster for Tamás T. Nagy by Péter Pócs, 2000

- 1987 – Academy of Fine Art, Stuttgart
- 2001 – Casa del Poeta, Mexico City
- 2002 – San Luis Potosí University – Facultad de Hábitat, San Luis Potosí
- 2002 – 20th International Graphic Arts Biennial, Brno
- 2002 – Moholy-Nagy University, Budapest
- 2003 – ITEMS, Guadalajara
- 2003 – Académico, Fac. de Artes Plásticas, Xalapa
- 2004 – ESAG, Paris
- 2009 – Art Academy, Osaka
- 2010 – University of West-Hungary, Sopron
- 2011 – School of Arts, Design and Architecture, Helsinki
- 2013 – Academy of Arts, Sofia
- 2014 – National Gallery of Arts, Tirana
- 2015 – Skopje Poster Festival, Skopje
- 2023 – National Art Academy, Sofia
- 2023 – National Art Academy, Burgas
- 2023 – College of National Arts, Plovdiv
- 2024 - Poster Loneliness, MTA 197th Assembly of MTA, Budapest
- 2024 - Hungarian Poster Loneliness Association, University of Rzeszow
- 2025 - Hungarian Poster Loneliness Association, Instituto de Artes Plásticas, Xalapa

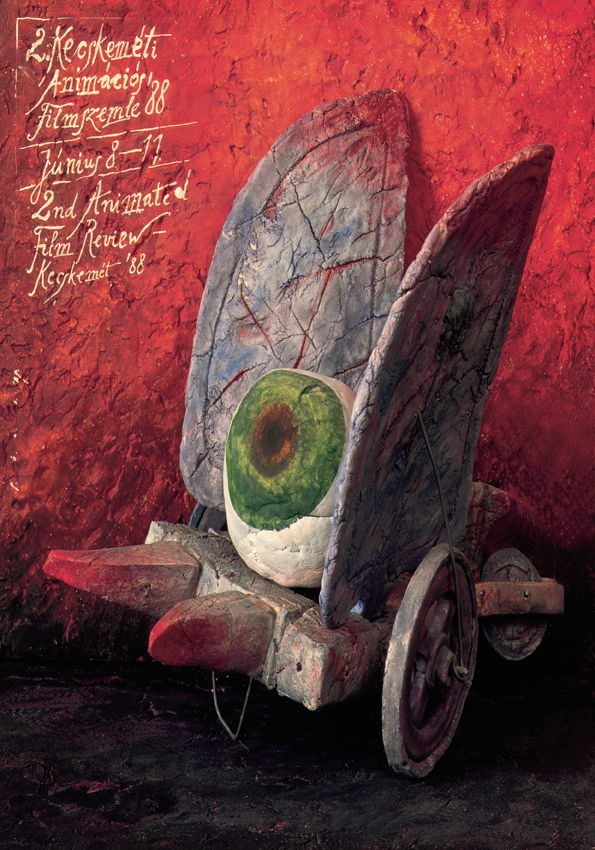
Animation Film Festival, Kecskemét '88 by Péter Pócs, 1988

=== Jury member ===
- 1994 – 2nd International Poster Triennial, Trnava
- 2002 – XX. International Graphics Biennial, Brno
- 2002 – International Poster Biennial, Mexico City
- 2003 – International Theater Poster Biennial, Rzeszów
- 2004 – ESAG, Paris
- 2011 – XVIII. International Poster Biennial, Lahti
- 2013 – 7th International Triennial of Stage Poster, Sofia (BG)
- 2015 – Skopje Poster Festival, Skopje
- 2021 – I. International Poster Art Biennial, Seoul
- 2024 - 19th International Biennale of Theatre Poster Rzeszów

=== Awards ===
- 1982 – 1st prize, Best Posters of the Year, Hungarian National Gallery, Budapest
- 1983 – Gold Medal, International Movie Poster Exhibition, Chicago
- 1983 – Award of Excellence, Best Posters of the Year, Hungarian National Gallery, Budapest
- 1983 – Studio Award, FKS, Ernst Museum, Budapest
- 1984 – Youth Award, Intergrafik '84, Berlin
- 1984 – Award of Excellence, Best Posters of the Year, Hungarian National Gallery, Budapest
- 1984 – Studio Award, FKS, Ernst Museum, Budapest
- 1984 – Award, County Graphics Exhibition, Kecskemét
- 1984 – 2nd prize, New Print, Hungarian National Gallery, Budapest
- 1985 – Award of Excellence, Best Posters of the Year, Hungarian National Gallery, Budapest
- 1986 – Bronze medal, International Poster Biennial, Brno
- 1986 – Main Award, Best Posters of the Year, Hungarian National Gallery, Budapest
- 1986 – Special award, The Hollywood Reporter, International Movie Poster Exhibition, Hollywood
- 1986 – Award of Excellence, Best Posters of the Year, Hungarian National Gallery, Budapest
- 1987 – Special Award, The Hollywood Reporter, International Movie Poster Exhibition, Hollywood
- 1988 – Silver medal, The Art Directors Club Winners 67th Annual Awards and 2nd Annual International Exhibition, New York City
- 1988 – Main Award, Best Posters of the Year, Hungarian National Gallery, Budapest
- 1988 – Special Award, International Poster Biennial, Warsaw
- 1988 – Zycie Warszawy Award, International Poster Biennial, Warsaw
- 1988 – Special Award, National Graphics Biennial, Békéscsaba
- 1989 – Jules Cheret Award, International Movie Poster Exhibition, Annecy
- 1989 – First Prize, International Salon of Photography, Kalisz
- 1989 – Award of Excellence, Ministry of Culture, Budapest
- 1992 – EPICA Award (Europe's Best Advertising) Paris
- 1993 – Special Award, Cresta Awards, New York
- 1994 – Master's Eye Award, International Poster Triennial, Trnava
- 1996 – Special Award, International Poster Exhibition, Fort Collins
- 1997 – Mihály Munkácsy Award, Budapest
- 1997 – Four bronze medals, 9th Annual Dimensional Art Directors and Illustrators Award Show, New York
- 2000 – Silver medal, International Poster Biennial, Mexico
- 2002 – Bronze medal, International Poster Biennial, Seoul
- 2009 – Culture Minister's Award, XIX. International Humour and Satire Biennial, Gabrovo
- 2009 – 5 Stars Award, International Poster Triennial, Osaka
- 2022 – 1st Prize, Pristina International Poster Festival, Pristina
- 2026 – 3rd Prize, 2nd International Poster Competition "Icons of Freedom. TRUTH" – Iłża

=== Scholarship ===
1992 – Hungarian Academy, Rome

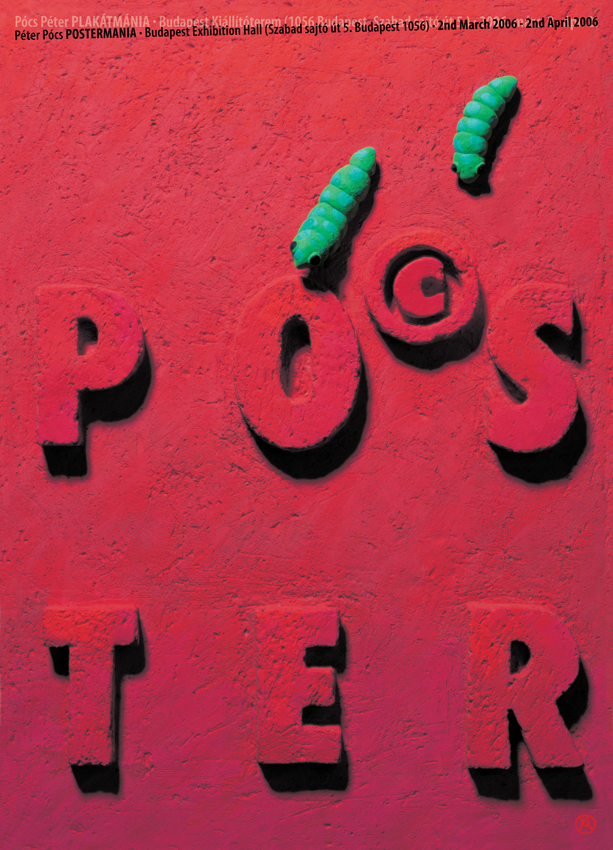
Plakátmánia by Péter Pócs, 2006

=== Publications ===
==== Books ====
- 1990 – Bakos – Hegyi – Ducki: Pócs Plakátok, Zrínyi Kiadó, Budapest, ISBN 963-02-7895-2
- 2000 – Pócs Péter: UNITED COLORS OF HUNG(A)RY, Poster'V. Design Studio, Budapest
- 2000 – Pócs Péter: Magyar Millennium, Poster'V. Design Studio, Budapest
- 2001 – Sveistrup Jensen – Strougård – Piippo: Posters from Hungary, Poster'V. Design Studio, Budapest ISBN 963-00-7679-9
- 2002 – Pócs Péter: (H)ARCOK, Poster'V. Design Studio, Budapest, ISBN 963-204-136-4
- 2003 – Fitz – Bermúdez – Parti Nagy – Walton – Szakolczay – Hegyi: PÓCS – PLAKÁTOK – 2003 – 1977, Poster'V. Design Studio, Budapest, ISBN 963-212-056-6
- 2004 – Irena Veshtak-Ostromenskaja: 50 Posters by Péter Pócs, Hungary; Poster'V. Design Studio, Budapest ISBN 963-216-553-5
- 2009 – Hansen – Nyholm – Ducki – Orosz – Pócs: Magyar Karma, Poster'V. Design Studio, Gozo, Malta ISBN 978-963-06-7897-1
- 2014 – Shabani – Fitz – Tërshana – Loesch – Ljubicic – Piippo – Bundi – Drewinski: Posters and Ideas, National Gallery of Arts, Tirana ISBN 978-99943-977-4-7
- 2016 – Gjikola – Maliqi: 3P3D, Péter Pócs Posters, Biblioteka Kombetare, Pristine ISBN 978-9951-587-58-7

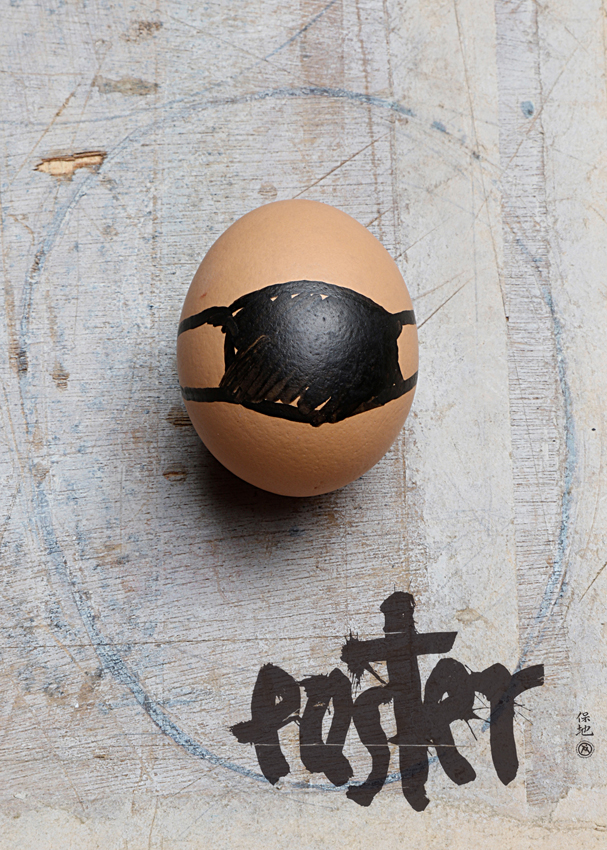
Easter by Péter Pócs, 2020

==== Selected articles ====
- 1982 – P. Szabó Erno: Pócs Péter, Muvészet (H) 1982/5.
- 1983 – Husz Mária: Pócs Péter plakátjai, Muvészet, (H) 1983/6.
- 1986 – Borzák Tinor: A jó plakát: váratlan pofon, Új Tükör, (H) 1986/47.
- 1987 – P. Szucs Julianna: Bele a képünkbe, Pócs Péter plakátjai a Dorottya utcai Galériában, Népszabadság, Budapest (H), 1987. April 29.
- 1987 – Buda Ferenc: Kötésen át két szem figyel: Pócs Péter plakátjai, Forrás, 19/11 (H)
- 1988 – Ligeti Nagy Tamás.: Én megcsinálom, o betiltja, mi nem látjuk, (H) Reform,1988/8.
- 1988 – Hudra Klára: Kézjegy, Muvészet, (H) 1988/2.
- 1989 – Koloh Elek: Egérfogó fogta csillag (H) 1989/165.
- 1990 – Margaret Timmers: Posters of Freedom, EYE, London (GB), 1990/1
- 1990 – Gianfranco Torri: In manifesto senza publicitá, Linea Grafica, Milano (I), 1990/5
- 1990 – Graphic Design in East Europe, IDEA Special Issue, (JP), 1990/6
- 1990 – FrankJános: Egy pamfletista – Pócs Péter; Vigadó Galéria (Budapest) Élet és irodalom, 34/44. (H) 1990. Nov. 2.
- 1990 – Bakos Katalin: A változás jelei (Plakátok 1988 – 1990), Magyar Nemzeti Galéria, Budapest (H), HU ISSN 0231-2387
- 1991 – Szakolczay Lajos: Gúny, öngúny, világmagyarázat – Pócs Péter plakátjai, Kortárs, 35/10 (H)
- 1992 – Art as Activist (Revolutionary Posters of Central and Eastern Europe), Universe Publishing, New York (USA), ISBN 0-87663-623-7
- 1992 – Dana Bartelt: Art as Activist (Revolutionary Posters of Central and Eastern Europe), Communication Arts, (USA), January/February 1992
- 1993 – Graphic Design of the World, Vol. 1, Kodansha, (JP), ISBN 4-06-205144-3
- 1993 – The 100 Best Posters from Europe and the United States 1945 – 1990, Toppan Printing Co., Ltd. Tokyo (JP)
- 1993 – Liz McQuiston: Graphic Agitation (Social and Political Graphics since the Sixties), Phaidon Press Ltd., London (GB), ISBN 0-7148-2878-5
- 1993 – Europe without Walls (Art, Posters and Revolution 1989 – 93), edited by: James Aulich and Tim Wilcox, Manchester City Art Galleries, (GB), ISBN 0-901673-44-7
- 1994 – Kozák Csaba: Pócsul gondolkodni, Reklám és Grafika, Budapest (H), 1994/2
- 1995 – Bakos Katalin: Musen und kanonen (Ungarische Plakatkunst der Gegenwart), Museum für Kunst und Gewerbe, Hamburg (GER)
- 1996 – Jean-Luc Galus, Laure Vitrac, Christine Williame: Le Francais en Bac Pro / Textes et méthodes, Nathan (FR)
- 1997 – Kozák Csaba: Pócs Péter tervezo grafikusmuvész, Magyar Iparmuvészet, Budapest (H), 1997/2
- 1998 – Margaret Timmers: The Power of the Posters, Victoria and Albert Museum London (GB), ISBN 1-85177-240-5
- 1998 – Eve M. Kahn: A Woman's Leg, a Kitchen Floor, a Cheese, Print, (USA) March /April 1998
- 1999 - Bánszky Pál: „Kecskeméten mindíg úgy éreztem, hogy büntetésben vagyok“ Interjú Pócs Péter grafikus művésszel, Köztér, Kecskemét, 1999. november. 2
- 2000 – James Aulich and Marta Sylvestrová: Political Posters in Central and Eastern Europe 1945 – 95 (Signs of the Times), Manchester University Press, (GB), ISBN 0-7190-5418-4, and0-7190-5419-2
- 2001 – Anthon Beeke – Alain Weil – Daniéle Devynck: Le Nouveau Salon des Cent, (Exposition International d'affiches), Editions Odyssée, (FR), ISBN 2-909478-13-0
- 2001 – Kortárs Magyar Muvészeti Lexikon, Enciklopédia Kiadó, Budapest (H), ISBN 963-8477-46-6
- 2002 – Kozák Csaba: Alátét, Orpheusz Kiadó, Budapest (H), ISBN 963-9377-29-5
- 2002 – My Poster I am, Package Design, Peking (CN), ISSN 1007-4759
- 2002 – Parti Nagy Lajos: A vizuális egérfogó, Élet és Irodalom, Budapest (H), 2002 október 4.
- 2002 – Xavier Bermúdez: Péter Pócs, Lúdica, Mexikóváros (MEX), 2002 December
- 2004 – Péter Pócs, PISO 04, Guadalajara (MEX)
- 2005 – Milton Glaser – Mirko Ilic: The design of Dissent, Rockport Publishers, New York (USA)
- 2005 – Jianping He: All men are brothers, Hesing, Shanghai + Berlin (PRC+D) ISBN 3-9810544-0-7
- 2006 – Milton Glaser – Mirko Ilic: The design of Dissent, Editorial Gustavo Gili, SA, Barcelona (ES) ISBN 978-84-252-2076-0, and84-252-2076-9
- 2006 – Lajos Lóska: Plakátharsonák, Új Muvészet, 05 / 06, Budapest (H)
- 2006 – 1956 on posters, Hungarian Poster Association, Budapest (H) ISBN 963-06-1116-3
- 2006 – TrencsényiZoltán: PócsPéter, Plakátmánia, Népszabadság, 64/51
- 2008 – Dimitris Arvanitis: Péter Pócs (One of the Last Poster Maniac Artist), Adobe 5 / 08, Athens (GK)
- 2008 – Péter Pócs: Poster is me, New Graphic, 16 / 08, Nanjing (PRC)
- 2008 – From the end of 1900s to the beginning of the XXI century, Trama Visual, México (MEX)
- 2009 – The letters of Bulgaria alphabet of Europe, ITOSP, Sofia, 2009 (BG)
- 2009 – Humour (Posters from around the world), Kunstmuseum, Cottbus ISBN 978-3-928696-94-4 (GER)
- 2009 – World of Posters Danish Poster Museum, Århus (DK) ISBN 87-90552-21-0
- 2009 – Lars Dybdahl: The Global Poster, Nyt Nordisk Forlag Arnold Busck, Copenhagen (DK) ISBN 978-87-17-04058-8
- 2013 – Aladár Szilágyi: “Posters start when words end.” Distance talk with Péter Pócs poster designer living in Tirana, Várad, 12 / 07, Oradea (RO)
- 2015 – Art dhe veprimtari në GKA, Galeria Kombëtare e Arteve, Tiranë (AL)
- 2015 – Sümegi: Posters of 1956. (1956–2006), Corvina Publishing House, Budapest (H) ISBN 978-963-13-6297-8
- 2015 – Mónika Zombori: Exhibitions of the Studio in the mirror of contemporaneous documents,(3rd part: the Eighties), Artmagazin, 2015/10, Budapest (H) ISSN 1785-3060 2015 – György Sümegi: Posters of Péter Pócs about 1956 (Each one has a wholesome story), Muérto October/2015, Budapest (H) ISSN 1419-0567
- 2017 – Buda Ferenc: Pócs Péternek üdvözlet, Forrás, 49/1 (H)
- 2020 – Varga Mihály: Pócs Péter Portré, PR Herald, 2020. July 1. (H)
- 2022 - Steven Heller: The Daily Heller: Hungary, in Solidarity With Ukraine, Printmag, 2022. március 30.
- 2023 – Kozák Csaba: PLAKÁTMAGÁNY, Balkon, 2023 – 1, 2 (H)
- 2023 – Maya Stefanova: Peter Pocs and the world's richest language, Vijmag
- 2023 – Maczó Péter: 3P/3D Pócs Péter plakátjai, Magyar Grafika, 2023/5 (H)
- 2023 – P. Szabó Dénes: A deviáns emberekben mindig van valami különleges, csak meg kell találni, Népszava, 2023/11 (H)
- 2024 - Borzák Tibor: Minden plakát üzenet, Országút, 2024. November 14.
- 2024 - PÓCSCSELEKVÉS, Magyar Iparművészet, 2024/6
- 2025 - Steven Heller: The Daily Heller: Shock and Awful..., PRintmag, March 4, 2025
- 2025 - Péter Pócs: The Visual Philosopher of Hungarian Poster Art, Cootermag, April 27, 2025
- 2025 - José Manuel Morelos Villegas: Péter Pócs con nosotros… otra vez, Pregones de Ciencia No.7, September 7, 2025 (MEX) ISSN 3061-7898

== Interviews ==
- FUGA567_online: Átokplakátok talk (H)
- Interview, Klubradio (H) | Pócs Péter
- FUGA527_online: SZIMA talk (H)
- Poster Loneliness presentation, MTA (H)

== Artworks in collections ==
- Hungarian National Museum, Budapest
- Korea Design Center, Seoul
- Kecskeméti Képtár, Kecskemét
- Kunstbibliothek Berlin, Berlin
- National Széchényi Library, Budapest
- Kiscelli Museum, Budapest
- Museum für Kunst und Gewerbe Hamburg
- Hungarian National Gallery, Budapest
- Franz Mayer Museum, Mexico City
- Moravská Gallery, Brno
- Mihály Munkácsy Museum, Békéscsaba
- Poster Museum, Lahti
- Poster Museum, Wilanow
- Victoria and Albert Museum, London
- National Museum, Poznań
- Museum of Modern Art, Toyama
- Ōgaki Poster Museum, Ōgaki
- Museum of Modern Art, New York
- BMW Museum, Munich
- KG, Trnava
- Humour and Satire Museum, Gabrovo
- Jerusalem Museum, Jerusalem
- Stedelijk Museum, Amsterdam
- M. Jose Luis Cuevas, Mexico City
- Toulouse-Lautrec Museum, Albi
- Staatliche Museen zu Berlin, Berlin
- CKS Art Gallery, Taipei
- Museum der Stadt, Osnabrück
- Wille de l'affiche, Chaumont
- Manchester Art Gallery Manchester
- Curfmann Gallery, Fort Collins
- National Gallery of Arts, Tirana
- Pécs Gallery, Pécs
- József Katona Museum, Kecskemét
- International Triennial of Stage Poster, Sofia
- Budapest History Museum, Budapest
