= Stanley Osher =

American mathematician (born 1942)

Stanley Joel Osher
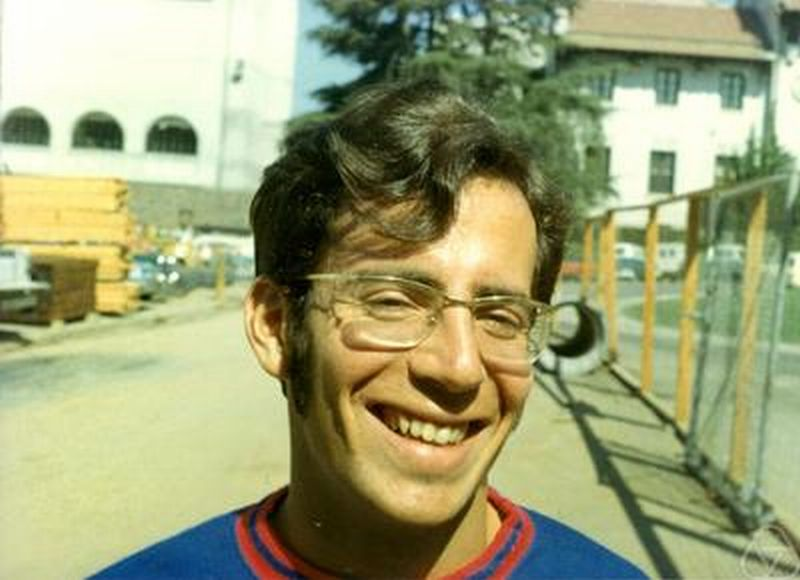
- Osher in 1968
- Born: April 24, 1942 (age 84); Brooklyn, New York, U.S.
- Known for: Level-set method; Shock-capturing methods; image processing; L^{1}/TV methods; Bregman method
- Scientific career
- Fields: Applied mathematics
- Workplaces: UCLA; SUNY, Stony Brook; UC Berkeley
- Doctoral advisor: Jacob Schwartz
- Doctoral students: Rosa Donat; Ron Fedkiw; Chiu-Yen Kao; Chi-Wang Shu

Stanley Osher (born April 24, 1942) is an American mathematician, known for his many contributions in shock capturing, level-set methods, and PDE-based methods in computer vision and image processing. Osher is a professor at the University of California, Los Angeles (UCLA), Director of Special Projects in the Institute for Pure and Applied Mathematics (IPAM) and member of the California NanoSystems Institute (CNSI) at UCLA.

== Education and career ==
Osher received a bachelor's degree from Brooklyn College in 1962. He continued his studies at New York University, where he received a master's degree in 1964 and completed his Ph.D. in 1966.

After two years working at the Brookhaven National Laboratories, he joined the University of California, Berkeley as an assistant professor of mathematics in 1968. He moved to Stony Brook University as an associate professor in 1970, and there was promoted to full professor in 1975. He moved again to the University of California, Los Angeles Department of Mathematics in 1977.

He co-founded a spinoff company, Cognitech, in 1988, and remained affiliated with Cognitech until 1995.

== Recognition ==
Osher was a Fulbright Fellow in 1971, an Alfred P. Sloan Fellow, 1972–1974 an SERC Fellow in England in 1982, and a US-Israel BSF Fellow in 1986.

He was elected to the National Academy of Sciences in 2005, to the American Academy of Arts and Sciences in 2009, and to the National Academy of Engineering in 2018. He was named as a Fellow of the Society for Industrial and Applied Mathematics in 2009, and of the American Mathematical Society in 2013.

He is a 1992 recipient of the NASA Public Service Group Achievement Award, the 2002 recipient of the Computational Mechanics Award of the Japan Society of Mechanical Engineering, the 2003 recipient of the ICIAM Pioneer Prize, the 2005 recipient of the SIAM Kleinman Prize, the 2007 recipient of the Computational and Applied Sciences Award of the United States Association for Computational Mechanics, and the 2007 recipient of the International Cooperation Award, given at the International Congress of Chinese Mathematicians. He received the 2013 John von Neumann Lecture prize from SIAM, the 2014 Carl Friedrich Gauss Prize, and the 2016 William Benter Prize in Applied Mathematics.

He has honorary doctorates from ENS Cachan in France in 2006 and from Hong Kong Baptist University in 2009. He was a plenary speaker at the 2010 International Congress of Mathematicians.

== Books authored ==
Osher's books include:

- Osher, Stanley (2003). Level set methods and dynamic implicit surfaces. New York: Springer. ISBN 978-0-387-22746-7. OCLC 53224633.
- Osher, Stanley (2003). Geometric level set methods in imaging, vision, and graphics. New York: Springer. ISBN 978-0-387-21810-6. OCLC 56066930.
- Glowinski, R (2016). Splitting methods in communication, imaging, science, and engineering. Cham, Switzerland: Springer. ISBN 978-3-319-41589-5. OCLC 967938355.

== See also ==
- James Sethian, co-developer of level-set methods.
