= Regularization =

Regularization may refer to:

- Regularization (linguistics)
- Regularization (mathematics)
- Regularization (physics)
- Regularization (solid modeling)
- Regularization Law, an Israeli law intended to retroactively legalize settlements

== See also ==
- Matrix regularization
