= Constantine Caramanis =

Professor at The University of Texas at Austin

- Born: August 25, 1977 (age 49)
- Education: Harvard University (AB); Massachusetts Institute of Technology (MS, PhD)
- Awards: Fellow of the IEEE (2023); NSF CAREER Award (2011)
- Scientific career
- Fields: Machine learning, mathematical optimization, high-dimensional statistics
- Workplaces: University of Texas at Austin
- Thesis: Adaptable optimization: theory and algorithms (2006)

Constantine Caramanis (born August 25, 1977) is a professor in the Department of Electrical and Computer Engineering at the University of Texas at Austin, where he holds the Chandra Family Endowed Distinguished Professorship in Electrical and Computer Engineering. His research concerns machine learning, high-dimensional statistics, optimization, and decision-making in large-scale systems.

== Education and career ==
Caramanis received an AB in mathematics from Harvard University and MS and PhD degrees in electrical engineering and computer science from the Massachusetts Institute of Technology. His doctoral dissertation, completed in 2006, was titled Adaptable optimization: theory and algorithms. He joined the University of Texas at Austin faculty in 2006.

== Research and recognition ==
Caramanis's work includes robust and adaptable optimization, high-dimensional statistics, machine learning, and applications involving communications, transportation, energy, and social networks. In 2011, he received a National Science Foundation CAREER Award for research on high-dimensional statistics and the analysis of corrupted or incomplete data.

Caramanis was elevated to Fellow of the IEEE in the 2023 class for contributions to robust statistics and high-dimensional optimization.
