= Kitchen sink =

Kitchen sink may refer to:

- A sink in a kitchen for washing dishes, vegetables, etc.
- Freaks of Nature (film), a 2015 comedy horror film, also known as Kitchen Sink
- Kitchen Sink, a 1989 horror short directed by Alison Maclean
- Kitchen Sink (TV series), cookery series on Food Network
- "Kitchen Sink", a song by Twenty One Pilots from their album Regional at Best
- Kitchen Sink (album), an album by Nadine Shah, 2020
- Kitchen Sink Press, an independent comic book publisher
- Kitchen sink realism, a British cultural movement in the late 1950s and early 1960s
- Kitchen sink syndrome, also known as "scope creep" in project management
- Kitchen sink regression, a usually pejorative term for a regression analysis which uses a long list of possible independent variables
