= Fraction of variance unexplained =

Statistical noise

In statistics, the fraction of variance unexplained (FVU) in the context of a regression task is the fraction of variance of the regressand (dependent variable) $Y$ which cannot be explained, i.e., which is not correctly predicted, by the explanatory variables $X$.

== Formal definition ==
Suppose we are given a regression function $f$ yielding for each $y_i$ an estimate $\widehat{y}_i = f(x_i)$ where $x_i$ is the vector of the i^{th} observations on all the explanatory variables. We define the fraction of variance unexplained (FVU) as:

$$\begin{align}
\text{FVU} & = {\text{VAR}_\text{err} \over \text{VAR}_\text{tot}} = {\text{SS}_\text{err}/N \over \text{SS}_\text{tot}/N} = {\text{SS}_\text{err} \over \text{SS}_\text{tot}} \left( = 1-{\text{SS}_\text{reg} \over \text{SS}_\text{tot}} , \text{ only true in some cases such as linear regression}\right) \\[6pt]
& = 1 - R^2
\end{align}$$

where $R^2$ is the coefficient of determination and $\text{VAR}_\text{err}$ and $\text{VAR}_\text{tot}$ are the variance of the residuals and the sample variance of the dependent variable. $\text{SS}_\text{err}$ (the sum of squared predictions errors, equivalently the residual sum of squares), $\text{SS}_\text{tot}$ (the total sum of squares), and $\text{SS}_\text{reg}$ (the sum of squares of the regression, equivalently the explained sum of squares) are given by

$$\begin{align}
\text{SS}_\text{err} & = \sum_{i=1}^N\;(y_i - \widehat{y}_i)^2\\
\text{SS}_\text{tot} & = \sum_{i=1}^N\;(y_i-\bar{y})^2 \\
\text{SS}_\text{reg} & = \sum_{i=1}^N\;(\widehat{y}_i-\bar{y})^2 \text{ and}  \\
\bar{y} & = \frac 1 N \sum_{i=1}^N\;y_i.
\end{align}$$

Alternatively, the fraction of variance unexplained can be defined as follows:

$$\text{FVU} = \frac{\operatorname{MSE}(f)}{\operatorname{var}[Y]}$$

where $\text{MSE}(f)$ is the mean squared error of the regression function f.

== Explanation ==
It is useful to consider the second definition to understand FVU. When trying to predict $Y$, the most naive regression function that we can think of is the constant function predicting the mean of $Y$, i.e., $f(x_i)=\bar{y}$. It follows that the $\text{MSE}$ of this function equals the variance of $Y$; that is, $\text{SS}_\text{err} = \text{SS}_\text{tot}$, and $\text{SS}_\text{reg} = 0$. In this case, no variation in $Y$ can be accounted for, and the FVU then has its maximum value of 1.

More generally, the FVU will be 1 if the explanatory variables $X$ tell us nothing about $Y$ in the sense that the predicted values of $Y$ do not covary with $Y$. But as prediction gets better and the $\text{MSE}$ can be reduced, the FVU goes down. In the case of perfect prediction where $\hat{y}_i = y_i$ for all $i$, the $\text{MSE}$ is 0, $\text{SS}_\text{err} = 0$, $\text{SS}_\text{reg} = \text{SS}_\text{tot}$, and the FVU is 0.

== See also ==
- Coefficient of determination
- Correlation
- Explained sum of squares
- Lack-of-fit sum of squares
- Linear regression
- Regression analysis
- Mean absolute scaled error
