= Performance effects =

Strategy researchers want to understand differences in firm performance. Studies show that three effects account for most performance differences, such as differences between Toyota’s cars business and Samsung’s mobile phones business.

== Levels of analysis ==
Performance effects occur at multiple level of analysis.

The performance ($p_{ict}$) of a business in industry $i$, corporation $c$, and year $t$ can be written as:

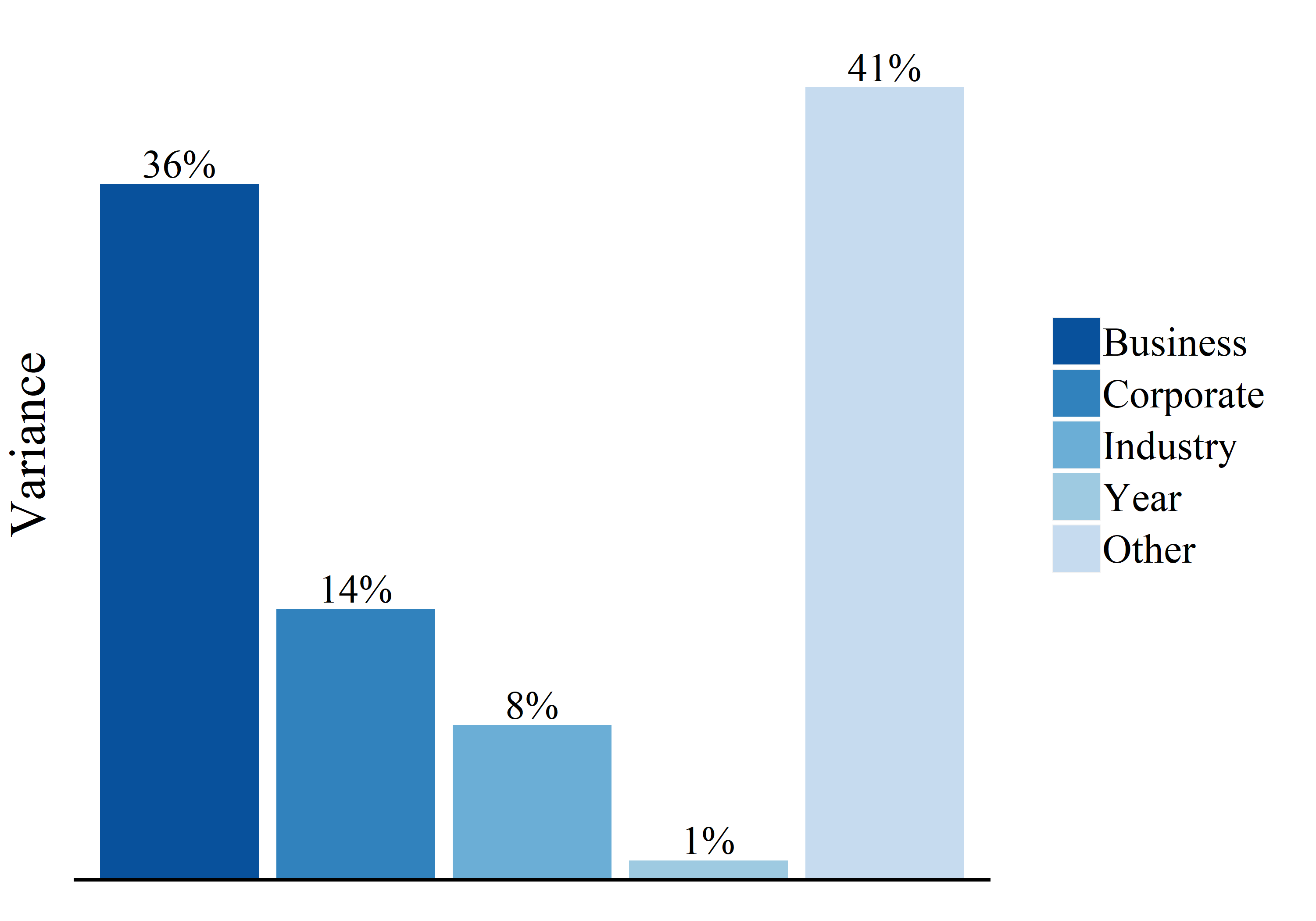
Fig:1 Performance effects (variance)

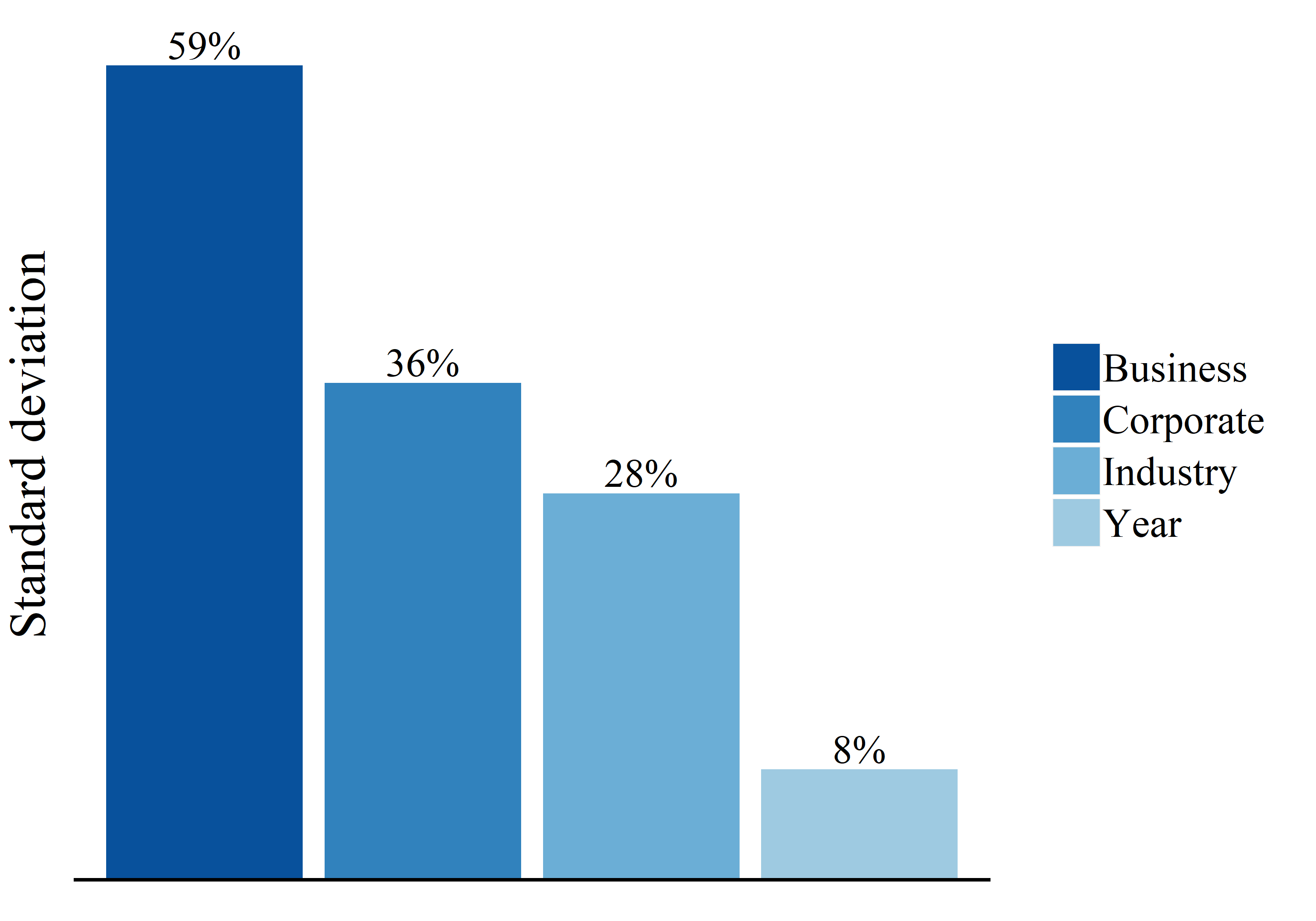
Fig:2 Performance effects (standard deviation)

=== Other ===
Other performance effects include the chief executive officer and geographical region or country.

=== Effect sizes ===
An effect size is a measure of the magnitude of performance differences.

A common measure is the variance. A finding of 36% for business effects means that the variance in business effects is 36% of the total variance in performance. Conversely, the variance in performance is for about one third related to differences between business with the other two-thirds related to other effects (e.g. different industries, different corporations, different year, and random differences). An upside of the variance measure is that the effects sum to 100%. A downside is that the variance uses squared distances so that large effects are amplified and small effects are shrunk.

Another measure is standard deviation, which is the square root of variance. An upside of this measure is that the standard deviation relates to linear distances so effects are not similarly amplified or shrunk. For example, business effects are greater than year effects by about factor 45 when using variance and by about only factor 8 when using standard deviation. Relatedly, the standard deviation measure has the same unit of measurement as performance. For example, if performance is in dollars, then the standard deviation is also in dollars (the variance would be in dollars squared). A downside is that the effects measured in standard deviations do not sum to 100%.

An alternative measure is the sum of squares measure. It seeks to attribute squared performance difference to the different effects. Because the sum of squares measure does not account for degrees of freedom, it is sensitive to sample dimensions. For example, sampling more businesses in the same number of industries will change the ratio of sum of squares due to industry and sum of squares due to business.

== See also ==
- Strategic management
