= Nico Nagelkerke =

Dutch biostatistician

- Born: Nicolaas Jan Dirk Nagelkerke; 1951 (age 74–75); The Hague, Netherlands
- Education: University of Leiden; University of Amsterdam
- Scientific career
- Fields: Biostatistics; Epidemiology
- Institutions: University of Leiden; United Arab Emirates University

Nicolaas Jan Dirk "Nico" Nagelkerke (born 1951) is a retired Dutch biostatistician and epidemiologist. He was a professor of biostatistics at the United Arab Emirates University and previously taught at the University of Leiden in the Netherlands.

In 1991, he defined the Nagelkerke R-squared, an equation adjusting the Cox and Snell R-squared value to be comparable to the traditional coefficient of determination.
