= Jennifer Hill =

American statistician

Jennifer Lynn Hill (born 1969) is an American statistician specializing in causal inference with applications to social statistics. She is a professor of applied statistics at New York University in the Steinhardt School of Culture, Education, and Human Development.

== Education and career ==
Hill majored in economics at Swarthmore College, graduating in 1991. She earned a master's degree in statistics at Rutgers University in 1995, and completed a Ph.D. in statistics at Harvard University in 2000. Her dissertation, Applications of Innovative Statistical Methodology for the Social Sciences, was jointly supervised by political scientist Gary King and statistician Donald Rubin.

She became an assistant professor in the Columbia University School of International and Public Affairs in 2002. She moved to the New York University Steinhardt School of Culture, Education, and Human Development in 2008, as an associate professor and founding co-director of the Center for Practice and Research at the Intersection of Information, Society, and Methodology (PRIISM). She was promoted to full professor in 2015.

== Books ==
Hill is the coauthor, with Andrew Gelman, of the book Data Analysis using Regression and Multilevel/Hierarchical Models (Cambridge University Press, 2007). With Gelman and Aki Vehtari, she is coauthor of Regression and Other Stories (Cambridge University Press, 2020).

== Recognition ==
Hill was the 2020–2021 winner of the New York University Distinguished Teaching Award.

== Personal life ==
With other statistics professors Bradley Carlin, Mark Glickman, Donald Hedeker, and Michael I. Jordan, Hill was a member of a music band, the Imposteriors.
