= Andrew Gelman =

American statistician

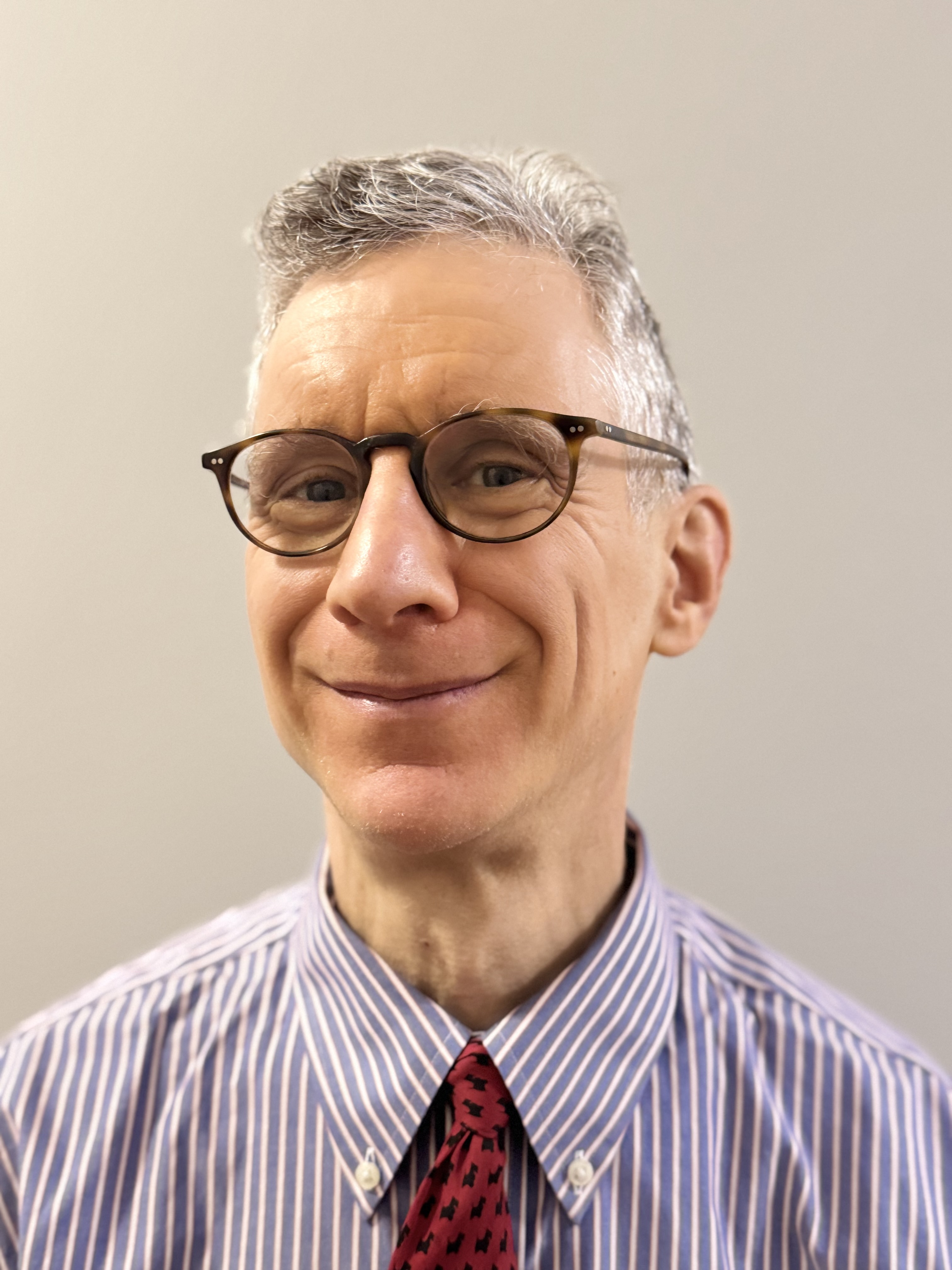
- Born: Andrew Eric Gelman; February 11, 1965 (age 61); Philadelphia, Pennsylvania, U.S.
- Education: Massachusetts Institute of Technology (SB); Harvard University (MA, PhD)
- Spouse: Caroline Rosenthal (m. 2002)
- Children: 3
- Relatives: Susan Gelman (sister); Woody Gelman (uncle)
- Awards: COPSS Presidents' Award (2003)
- Scientific career
- Fields: Statistics
- Workplaces: Columbia University
- Thesis: Topics in Image Reconstruction from Emission Tomography (1990)
- Doctoral advisor: Donald Rubin
- Website: stat.columbia.edu/~gelman/

Andrew Eric Gelman (born February 11, 1965) is an American statistician who is Higgins Professor of Statistics and a professor of political science at Columbia University. Gelman attended the Massachusetts Institute of Technology as a National Merit Scholar, and graduated with Bachelor of Science degrees in mathematics and in physics in 1986. He then received a Master of Science degree in 1987 and a Doctor of Philosophy in 1990, both in statistics from Harvard University, under the supervision of Donald Rubin.

== Career ==
Gelman is the Higgins Professor of Statistics and Professor of Political Science and the Director of the Applied Statistics Center at Columbia University. He is a major contributor to statistical philosophy and methods especially in Bayesian statistics and hierarchical models.

He is one of the leaders of the development of the statistical programming framework Stan.

=== Perspective on Statistical Inference and Hypothesis Testing ===
Gelman's approach to statistical inference emphasizes studying variation and the associations between data, rather than searching for statistical significance.

Gelman says his approach to hypothesis testing is "(nearly) the opposite of the conventional view" of what is typical for statistical inference. While the standard approach may be seen as having the goal of rejecting a null hypothesis, Gelman argues that you can't learn much from a rejection. On the other hand, a non-rejection tells you something: "[it] tells you that your study is noisy, that you don't have enough information in your study to identify what you care about—even if the study is done perfectly, even if measurements are unbiased and your sample is representative of your population, etc. That can be some useful knowledge, it means you're off the hook trying to explain some pattern that might just be noise." Gelman also works within the context of larger confirmationist and falsificationist paradigms of science.

Gelman's approach to statistical inference is a major recurring theme of his work.

== Popular press ==
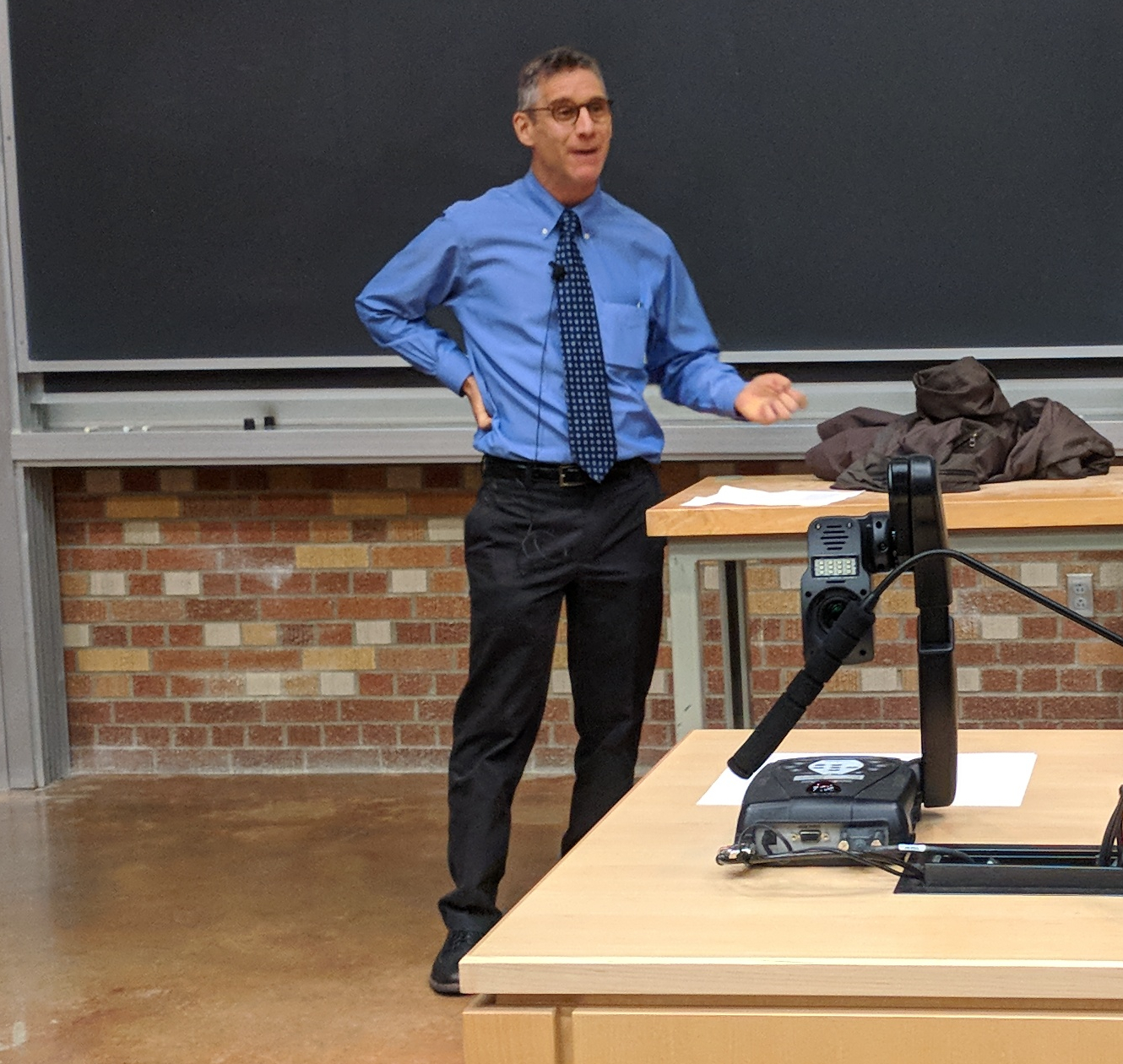
Speaking at the University of Washington in 2017

Gelman is notable for his efforts to make political science and statistics more accessible to journalists and to the public. He was one of the primary authors of "The Monkey Cage", blog published by The Washington Post. The blog is dedicated to providing informed commentary on politics and making political science more accessible.

Gelman also keeps his own blog which deals with statistical practices in social science. He frequently writes about Bayesian statistics, displaying data, and interesting trends in social science. According to The New York Times, on the blog "he posts his thoughts on best statistical practices in the sciences, with a frequent emphasis on what he sees as the absurd and unscientific... He is respected enough that his posts are well read; he is cutting enough that many of his critiques are enjoyed with a strong sense of schadenfreude."

Gelman is a prominent critic of poor methodological work and he identifies such work as contributing to the replication crisis.

== Honors ==
He has received the Outstanding Statistical Application award from the American Statistical Association three times, in 1998, 2000, and 2008. He is an elected fellow of the American Statistical Association and the Institute of Mathematical Statistics. He was elected fellow of the American Academy of Arts and Sciences (AAAS) in 2020 and the National Academy of Sciences in 2026.

== Personal life ==
Gelman married Caroline Rosenthal in 2002 and has three children. The psychologist Susan Gelman is his older sister and cartoonist Woody Gelman was his uncle. He has Tourette syndrome.

Gelman is a participant in the Study of Mathematically Precocious Youth.

== Bibliography ==
- Andrew Gelman, David Park, Boris Shor, and Jeronimo Cortina. Red State, Blue State, Rich State, Poor State: Why Americans Vote the Way They Do (2nd edition). Princeton University Press, 2009. ISBN 0-691-14393-5
- Andrew Gelman and Jennifer Hill. Data Analysis Using Regression and Multilevel/Hierarchical Models. Cambridge University Press, 2006. ISBN 978-0-521-68689-1
- Andrew Gelman and Deborah Nolan. Teaching Statistics: A Bag of Tricks. Oxford University Press, 2002. ISBN 978-0-19-857224-4
- Andrew Gelman, John B. Carlin, Hal S. Stern, David Dunson, Aki Vehtari, and Donald B. Rubin. Bayesian Data Analysis (3rd edition). Chapman & Hall/CRC, 2013. ISBN 1-4398-4095-4
- Andrew Gelman, Jennifer Hill, and Aki Vehtari. Regression and Other Stories. Cambridge University Press, 2020. ISBN 978-1107023987
