= Root mean square deviation =

Statistical measure

The root mean square deviation (RMSD) or root mean square error (RMSE) is a frequently used measure of the distances between actual observed values and an estimation of them (e.g. true/predicted in regression tasks of machine learning). The deviation is typically simply a differences of scalars; it can also be generalized to the vector lengths of a displacement, as in the bioinformatics concept of root mean square deviation of atomic positions.

== RMSD of a sample ==
The RMSD of a sample is the quadratic mean of the differences between the observed values and predicted ones. These deviations are called residuals when the calculations are performed over the data sample that was used for estimation (and are therefore always in reference to an estimate) and are called errors (or prediction errors) when computed out-of-sample (aka on the full set, referencing a true value rather than an estimate). The RMSD serves to aggregate the magnitudes of the errors in predictions for various data points into a single measure of predictive power. RMSD is a measure of accuracy, to compare forecasting errors of different models for a particular dataset and not between datasets, as it is scale-dependent.

RMSD is always non-negative, and a value of 0 (almost never achieved in practice) would indicate a perfect fit to the data. In general, a lower RMSD is better than a higher one. However, comparisons across different types of data would be invalid because the measure is dependent on the scale of the numbers used.

RMSD is the square root of the average of squared errors. The effect of each error on RMSD is proportional to the size of the squared error; thus larger errors have a disproportionately large effect on RMSD. Consequently, RMSD is sensitive to outliers.

== Formulas ==
=== Estimator ===
The RMSD of an estimator $\hat{\theta}$ with respect to an estimated parameter $\theta$ is defined as the square root of the mean squared error:
$$\operatorname{RMSD}(\hat\theta) = \sqrt{\operatorname{MSE}(\hat\theta)} = \sqrt{\operatorname{E}\big((\hat\theta - \theta)^2\big)}.$$

For an unbiased estimator, the RMSD is the square root of the variance, known as the standard deviation.

=== Samples ===
If X_{1}, ..., X_{n} is a sample of a population with true mean value $x_0$, then the RMSD of the sample is

$$\operatorname{RMSD} = \sqrt{\frac{1}{n}\sum_{i=1}^n(X_i-x_0)^2}$$.

The RMSD of predicted values $\hat y_t$ for times t of a regression's dependent variable $y_t,$ with variables observed over T times, is computed for T different predictions as the square root of the mean of the squares of the deviations:

$$\operatorname{RMSD}=\sqrt{\frac{\sum_{t=1}^T (y_t - \hat y_t)^2}{T}}.$$

(For regressions on cross-sectional data, the subscript t is replaced by i and T is replaced by n.)

In some disciplines, the RMSD is used to compare differences between two things that may vary, neither of which is accepted as the "standard". For example, when measuring the average difference between two time series $x_{1,t}$ and $x_{2,t}$, the formula becomes

$$\operatorname{RMSD}= \sqrt{\frac{\sum_{t=1}^T (x_{1,t} - x_{2,t})^2}{T}}.$$

== Normalization ==
Normalizing the RMSD facilitates the comparison between datasets or models with different scales. Though there is no consistent means of normalization in the literature, common choices are the mean or the range (defined as the maximum value minus the minimum value) of the measured data:

$\mathrm{NRMSD} = \frac{\mathrm{RMSD}}{y_\max -y_\min}$ or $\mathrm{NRMSD} = \frac {\mathrm{RMSD}}{\bar y}$.

This value is commonly referred to as the normalized root mean square deviation or error (NRMSD or NRMSE), and often expressed as a percentage, where lower values indicate less residual variance. This is also called Coefficient of Variation or Percent RMS. In many cases, especially for smaller samples, the sample range is likely to be affected by the size of sample which would hamper comparisons.

Another possible method to make the RMSD a more useful comparison measure is to divide the RMSD by the interquartile range (IQR). When dividing the RMSD with the IQR the normalized value gets less sensitive for extreme values in the target variable.

$\mathrm{RMSDIQR} = \frac{\mathrm{RMSD}}{IQR}$ where $IQR = Q_3 - Q_1$

with $Q_1 = \text{CDF}^{-1}(0.25)$ and $Q_3 = \text{CDF}^{-1}(0.75) ,$ where CDF^{−1} is the quantile function.

When normalizing by the mean value of the measurements, the term coefficient of variation of the RMSD, CV(RMSD) may be used to avoid ambiguity. This is analogous to the coefficient of variation with the RMSD taking the place of the standard deviation.

$$\mathrm{CV(RMSD)} = \frac {\mathrm{RMSD}}{\bar y} .$$

== Applications ==
- In meteorology, to see how effectively a mathematical model predicts the behavior of the atmosphere.
- In bioinformatics, the root mean square deviation of atomic positions is the measure of the average distance between the atoms of superimposed proteins.
- In structure based drug design, the RMSD is a measure of the difference between a crystal conformation of the ligand conformation and a docking prediction.
- In economics, the RMSD is used to determine whether an economic model fits economic indicators.
- In experimental psychology, the RMSD is used to assess how well mathematical or computational models of behavior explain the empirically observed behavior.
- In GIS, the RMSD is one measure used to assess the accuracy of spatial analysis and remote sensing.
- In hydrogeology, RMSD and NRMSD are used to evaluate the calibration of a groundwater model.
- In imaging science, the RMSD is part of the peak signal-to-noise ratio, a measure used to assess how well a method to reconstruct an image performs relative to the original image.
- In computational neuroscience, the RMSD is used to assess how well a system learns a given model.
- In protein nuclear magnetic resonance spectroscopy, the RMSD is used as a measure to estimate the quality of the obtained bundle of structures.
- Submissions for the Netflix Prize were judged using the RMSD from the test dataset's undisclosed "true" values.
- In the simulation of energy consumption of buildings, the RMSE and CV(RMSE) are used to calibrate models to measured building performance.
- In X-ray crystallography, RMSD (and RMSZ) is used to measure the deviation of the molecular internal coordinates deviate from the restraints library values.
- In control theory, the RMSE is used as a quality measure to evaluate the performance of a state observer.
- In fluid dynamics, normalized root mean square deviation (NRMSD), coefficient of variation (CV), and percent RMS are used to quantify the uniformity of flow behavior such as velocity profile, temperature distribution, or gas species concentration. The value is compared to industry standards to optimize the design of flow and thermal equipment and processes.

== See also ==
- Root mean square
- Mean absolute error
- Average absolute deviation
- Mean signed deviation
- Mean squared deviation
- Squared deviations
- Errors and residuals in statistics
- Coefficient of Variation
- Normalized estimation error squared
