= Total sum of squares =

Statistical quantity

In statistical data analysis the total sum of squares (TSS or SST) is a quantity that appears as part of a standard way of presenting results of such analyses. For a set of observations, $y_i, i\leq n$, it is defined as the sum over all squared differences between the observations and their overall mean $\bar{y}$.:

$$\mathrm{TSS}=\sum_{i=1}^{n}\left(y_{i}-\bar{y}\right)^2$$

For wide classes of linear models, the total sum of squares equals the explained sum of squares plus the residual sum of squares. For proof of this in the multivariate OLS case, see partitioning in the general OLS model.

In analysis of variance (ANOVA) the total sum of squares is the sum of the so-called "within-samples" sum of squares and "between-samples" sum of squares, i.e., partitioning of the sum of squares. In multivariate analysis of variance (MANOVA) the following equation applies

$$\mathbf{T} = \mathbf{W} + \mathbf{B},$$

where T is the total sum of squares and products (SSP) matrix, W is the within-samples SSP matrix and B is the between-samples SSP matrix. Similar terminology may also be used in linear discriminant analysis, where W and B are respectively referred to as the within-groups and between-groups SSP matrices.

== See also ==
- Squared deviations from the mean
- Sum of squares (statistics)
- Lack-of-fit sum of squares
- Expected mean squares
