= Kitchen sink regression =

Statistical regression analysis with long list of variables

Pejoratively, a kitchen sink regression is a statistical regression which uses a long list of possible independent variables to attempt to explain variance in a dependent variable. In economics, psychology, and other social sciences, regression analysis is typically used deductively to test hypotheses, but a kitchen sink regression does not follow this norm. Instead, the analyst throws "everything but the kitchen sink" into the regression in hopes of finding some statistical pattern.

This type of regression often leads to overfitting (i.e. misleadingly suggesting relationships between independent and dependent variables in the data, which can lead to hasty generalizations). The reason for this is that the more independent variables are included in a regression, the greater the probability that one or more will be found to be statistically significant while in fact having no causal effect on the dependent variable as an implication of the definition of confidence intervals—that is, the more likely the results are to be afflicted with Type I error.

== See also ==
- Data dredging – Misuse of data analysis
- Model selection – Task of selecting a statistical model from a set of candidate models
- Post hoc analysis – Statistical analyses that were not specified before the data were seen
- Post hoc theorizing – Problem of circular reasoning in statistics
