= Squared deviations from the mean =

Calculations in probability theory

Squared deviations from the mean (SDM) result from squaring deviations. In probability theory and statistics, the definition of variance is either the expected value of the SDM (when considering a theoretical distribution) or its average value (for actual experimental data). Computations for analysis of variance involve the partitioning of a sum of SDM.

== Background ==
An understanding of the computations involved is greatly enhanced by a study of the statistical value

$\operatorname{E}( X ^ 2 )$, where $\operatorname{E}$ is the expected value operator.

For a random variable $X$ with mean $\mu$ and variance $\sigma^2$,

$\sigma^2 = \operatorname{E}( X ^ 2 ) - \mu^2.$

(Its derivation is shown here.) Therefore,

$$\operatorname{E}(  X ^ 2 ) = \sigma^2 + \mu^2.$$

From the above, the following can be derived:

$$\operatorname{E}\left( \sum\left( X ^ 2\right) \right) = n\sigma^2 + n\mu^2,$$

$$\operatorname{E}\left( \left(\sum X \right)^ 2 \right) = n\sigma^2 + n^2\mu^2.$$

== Sample variance ==
The sum of squared deviations needed to calculate sample variance (before deciding whether to divide by n or n − 1) is most easily calculated as
$$S = \sum x ^ 2 - \frac{\left(\sum x\right)^2}{n}.$$

From the two derived expectations above the expected value of this sum is
$$\operatorname{E}(S) = n\sigma^2 + n\mu^2 - \frac{n\sigma^2 + n^2\mu^2}{n},$$
which implies
$$\operatorname{E}(S) = (n - 1)\sigma^2.$$

This effectively proves the use of the divisor n − 1 in the calculation of an unbiased sample estimate of σ^{2}.

== Partition — analysis of variance ==
In the situation where data is available for k different treatment groups having size n_{i} where i varies from 1 to k, then it is assumed that the expected mean of each group is

$$\operatorname{E}(\mu_i) = \mu + T_i$$

and the variance of each treatment group is unchanged from the population variance $\sigma^2$.

Under the Null Hypothesis that the treatments have no effect, then each of the $T_i$ will be zero.

It is now possible to calculate three sums of squares:

Individual

$$I = \sum x^2$$

$$\operatorname{E}(I) = n\sigma^2 + n\mu^2$$

Treatments

$$T = \sum_{i=1}^k \left(\left(\sum x\right)^2/n_i\right)$$

$$\operatorname{E}(T) = k\sigma^2 + \sum_{i=1}^k n_i(\mu + T_i)^2$$

$$\operatorname{E}(T) = k\sigma^2 + n\mu^2 + 2\mu \sum_{i=1}^k (n_iT_i) + \sum_{i=1}^k n_i(T_i)^2$$

Under the null hypothesis that the treatments cause no differences and all the $T_i$ are zero, the expectation simplifies to

$$\operatorname{E}(T) = k\sigma^2 + n\mu^2.$$

Combination

$$C = \left(\sum x\right)^2/n$$

$$\operatorname{E}(C) = \sigma^2 + n\mu^2$$

=== Sums of squared deviations ===
Under the null hypothesis, the difference of any pair of I, T, and C does not contain any dependency on $\mu$, only $\sigma^2$.

$\operatorname{E}(I - C) = (n - 1)\sigma^2$ total squared deviations aka total sum of squares

$\operatorname{E}(T - C) = (k - 1)\sigma^2$ treatment squared deviations aka explained sum of squares

$\operatorname{E}(I - T) = (n - k)\sigma^2$ residual squared deviations aka residual sum of squares

The constants (n − 1), (k − 1), and (n − k) are normally referred to as the number of degrees of freedom.

=== Example ===
In a very simple example, 5 observations arise from two treatments. The first treatment gives three values 1, 2, and 3, and the second treatment gives two values 4, and 6.

$$I = \frac{1^2}{1} + \frac{2^2}{1} + \frac{3^2}{1} + \frac{4^2}{1} + \frac{6^2}{1} = 66$$

$$T = \frac{(1 + 2 + 3)^2}{3} + \frac{(4 + 6)^2}{2} = 12 + 50 = 62$$

$$C = \frac{(1 + 2 + 3 + 4 + 6)^2}{5} = 256/5 = 51.2$$

Giving

Total squared deviations = 66 − 51.2 = 14.8 with 4 degrees of freedom.
Treatment squared deviations = 62 − 51.2 = 10.8 with 1 degree of freedom.
Residual squared deviations = 66 − 62 = 4 with 3 degrees of freedom.

=== Two-way analysis of variance ===
In statistics, the two-way analysis of variance (ANOVA) is an extension of the one-way ANOVA that examines the influence of two different categorical independent variables on one continuous dependent variable. The two-way ANOVA not only aims at assessing the main effect of each independent variable but also if there is any interaction between them.

== See also ==
- Absolute deviation
- Algorithms for calculating variance
- Errors and residuals
- Least squares
- Mean squared error
- Residual sum of squares
- Root mean square deviation
- Variance decomposition of forecast errors
