= Breusch =

Breusch is a surname. Notable people with the surname include:

- Robert Breusch (1907–1995), American number theorist
- Trevor S. Breusch (born c. 1953), Australian professor

== See also ==
- Breusch–Godfrey test, a statistics test
- Breusch–Pagan test, a statistics test
