= Herbert Glejser =

Belgian Economist

- Born: 2 January 1938; Vienna, Austria
- Died: 20 January 2024 (aged 86)
- Title: Professor and Doctor

Academic work
- Discipline: Economics; Econometrics
- Institutions: Université libre de Bruxelles; Vrije Universiteit Brussel; Facultés universitaires Notre-Dame de la Paix; Massachusetts Institute of Technology; University of California Berkeley; University of California at Los Angeles; Hebrew University of Jerusalem
- Notable ideas: Glejser test European Economic Review

Herbert Glejser (2 January 1938 – 20 January 2024) was a Belgian economist and econometrician. Early in his career, he became known for the Glejser test, a statistics test for heteroskedasticity he developed in 1969. He was an Economics professor in Belgium until 2003 and had been visiting professor in several US universities (MIT, Berkeley University, UCLA), as well as in Brazil, Germany and Israel. He was the founder and first editor of the European Economic Review, one of the oldest economics journals in Europe, with Jean Waelbroeck.

== Biography ==
=== Early life ===
Herbert Glejser was born on 2 January 1938 in Vienna, Austria, from a Jewish family. The Anschluss on 12 March 1938 forced his parents to flee from Austria and seek refuge in Belgium. The Glejser family obtained Belgian citizenship in 1955.

After his high school studies in Athénée royal de Bruxelles, Herbert Glejser started University at the age of 16, at the Université libre de Bruxelles (ULB) in the Social, Political and Economical Sciences Departement. Simultaneously, he enrolled in a degree in Business Engineering at the École de Commerce Solvay (now Solvay Brussels School of Economics and Management). In 1958, aged 20, he received his BA in Commercial Engineering and in March 1963, then 25, completed his PhD in Economics.

=== Academic life ===
In 1959, aged 21, Herbert Glejser was hired as Secretary and Research fellow at the Department in Applied Economics of ULB (DULBEA), the research centre of the Solvay Brussels School of Economics and Management and the Université libre de Bruxelles.

Assistant Professor at the ULB from 1963, Herbert Glejser became a full Professor in Economics in 1969, aged 31.

His interest focused in applied statistics and macroeconomics and, in 1981, he became one of the few Belgian economists to support the devaluation of the Belgian franc, despite the views of the National Bank of Belgium. Glejser deemed this measure inevitable to save "this impossible monster the Belgian economy had become". The Belgian franc has later been devalued, in February 1982.

In Belgium, from 1969, Herbert Glejser taught in Brussels universities (ULB and VUB) and from 1974 at the Facultés universitaires Notre-Dame de la Paix, in Namur. Abroad, he has been visiting Professor in the United States, notably at the Massachusetts Institute of Technology (MIT) in 1970 and 1974, at University of California, Berkeley in 1970, at University of California, Los Angeles (UCLA) in 1991; in Israel at the Hebrew University of Jerusalem in 1980-1981; in Germany at LMU Munich and in Brazil at the Federal University of Minas Gerais, in 1996.

Council Member and Emeritus fellow of the European Economic Association from 1986 to 1990, Glejser has been a Consultant for the European Economic Community from 1993.

=== Honors and awards ===
Herbert Glejser received the Fulbright Program scholarship in 1974, a visiting scholar grant in Harvard University for his project research on "Econometric analysis of American capital abroad". He was awarded a Professor Chair from the Francqui Foundation in 1982-1983, and won the Pommerehne Prize from the Association for Cultural Economics International (ACEI) in 2002 for his article Efficiency and inefficiency in the ranking in competitions: The case of the Queen Elisabeth Music Contest, co-written with economist Bruno Heyndels.

=== Glejser test ===
Herbert Glejser published A New Test for Heteroskedasticity in March 1969 in the Journal of the American Statistical Association where he develops a new test for heteroskedasticity, derived from the Park test that had been published by Rolla Edward Park in Econometrica in 1966

Glejser measures his test against the Goldfeld–Quandt test (1965): "[T]he new test seems to compare favourably, except perhaps in the case of large samples."

In 1996, Leslie George Godfrey has shown that the Glejser test for heteroskedasticity was valid only under conditional symmetry, and suggested some modifications. Improvements to the Glejser test have later been developed by Kyung So Im and by José António Machado and João Santos Silva

In 2020, the Glejser test was used to test the Dunning-Kruger hypothesis.

=== European Economic Review ===
In 1969, Herbert Glejser and Jean Waelbroeck founded and became first editors of the European Economic Review (EER).

They remained sole editors from 1969 to 1986, while EER publishers changed from the International Association of Applied Economics (ASEPELT) to North-Holland, then Elsevier. Over this period of time, over 10'000 article pages were selected by ca. 2'000 peer reviewers. In 1986, Glejser and Waelbroeck were joined by Peter Neary and Agnar Sandmo as associated editors. Jean Waelbroeck remained co-Editor-in-chief until 1991, Herbert Glejser for 25 years, until 1993.

=== See also ===
- Glejser test
- European Economic Review

=== Publications ===
- 2012 The United States Is Edging towards a Comparative Advantage in Services
- 2002 The support of the euro in the fifteen EU countries - politics and economics
- 2000 Decreasing Returns to Scale for the Small Country due to Scarcity or Indivisibility - A Test on Sport
- 1995 Estimativas dos efeitos no comércio da entrada de Portugal e Espanha na União Européia
- 1982 Du nouveau franc au renouveau économique: ébauche d'un programme
- 1976 Quantitative studies of international economic relations
- 1971 Higher inflation rates and international imbalances
- 1969-1993 European Economic Review (Editor and author)
- 1968 An explanation of differences in trade-product ratios among countries
- 1966 Controllo economico, gratuità e benessere
- 1965 Inflation, productivity, and relative prices - A statistical study
- 1959 Croissances industrielles comparées de l'Union Soviétique et des États-Unis
- 1954 La rencontre à l'aube
