= Portmanteau (disambiguation) =

A portmanteau is a word or morpheme whose form and meaning are derived from a blending of two or more distinct forms, e.g., smog from smoke and fog, or brunch from breakfast and lunch.

Portmanteau may also refer to:

- Portmanteau (luggage), a case or bag to carry clothes or mail in that opens into two equally sized compartments
- Portmanteau film, an anthology film made up of several short films that interrelate
- Portmanteau inhibitor, in pharmaceuticals, a drug which molecularly combines the active portions of two inhibitor-class drugs
- Portmanteau sentence, in linguistics, a particular type of code-switching
- Portmanteau test, in statistics, a test applied to autocorrelations of a time series
- Portmanteau theorem on convergence of measures in probability theory
- A coat rack, from the French porter (carry) and manteau (cloak)

== See also ==
- Border towns in the United States with portmanteau names
- List of portmanteaus
- Portamento, in music, a continuous change in pitch (unrelated)
