= Greta M. Ljung =

Finnish-born American statistician (1941–2024)

- Born: Greta Marianne Ljung; 1941; Jeppo, Finland
- Died: August 12, 2024 (aged 82); Lexington, Massachusetts, U.S.
- Education: Åbo Akademi University (BS, MS); University of Wisconsin–Madison (PhD)
- Known for: Ljung–Box test
- Scientific career
- Fields: Statistician
- Workplaces: MIT; Insurance Information Institute
- Thesis: Studies in the Modeling of Discrete Time Series
- Doctoral advisor: George E. P. Box

Greta Marianne Ljung (1941 – August 12, 2024) was a Finnish-American statistician. The Ljung–Box test for time series data is named after her and her doctoral advisor, George E. P. Box. She has written textbooks on time series analysis and her work has been published in several top statistical journals, including Biometrika and the Journal of the Royal Statistical Society.

== Biography ==
Born in Jeppo, Finland, Ljung received her B.S./M.S. degree in psychology from Åbo Akademi University in Finland. After graduation, she was a research fellow at the University of Uppsala, where she worked with statistician/econometrician Herman Wold.

She received her Ph.D. in Statistics at the University of Wisconsin–Madison in 1976. Her dissertation was on time series analysis. She held a faculty position at the University of Denver after graduation, where she continued to publish work with her advisor George E. P. Box. In 1978, they published their paper on the Ljung-Box test, which was a modification to the Box-Pierce test. She is also co-author of the fifth edition of the book Time Series Analysis: Forecasting and Control, originally published by Box and Jenkins (1972).

Ljung held faculty positions at Boston University and Massachusetts Institute of Technology. She was later principal scientist and chief statistician at AIR Worldwide (originally Applied Insurance Research) in Boston, where she led the development of probabilistic models to estimate potential economic losses from natural hazards such as hurricanes, tornadoes, hail storms, and wild fires.

Ljung died of cancer in Lexington, Massachusetts, on August 12, 2024, at the age of 82.

== Works ==
- Box, George E. P.; Jenkins, Gwilym M.; Reinsel, Gregory C.; Ljung, Greta M. (2016). Time Series Analysis: Forecasting and Control (5th ed.). New Jersey: Wiley. ISBN 978-1-118-67502-1.
