= Cochran test =

Cochran test may refer to two different statistical tests:

- Cochran's Q test, a non-parametric test that is applied to the analysis of two-way randomized block designs with a binary response variable.
- Cochran's C test, a variance outlier test.
