= Henry Kaiser (disambiguation) =

Henry J. Kaiser (1882–1967) was an American industrialist and shipbuilder.

Henry Kaiser may also refer to:

== People ==
- Henry Felix Kaiser (1927–1992), American psychologist and educator
- Henry Kaiser (musician) (born 1952), American jazz guitarist, grandson of Henry J. Kaiser

== Ships ==
- Henry J. Kaiser–class replenishment oiler, of the U.S. Navy
  - USNS Henry J. Kaiser, the lead ship of the class, in service since 1986

== See also ==
- Henry Keizer (1960–2019), Dutch businessman and politician
