= Jing Cao =

Chinese-American statistician

Jing Cao is a statistician whose research interests include Bayesian statistics, clinical trials, text mining, and the application of sentiment analysis in the statistics of wine tasting. She is a professor of statistics at Southern Methodist University, where she is director of graduate studies in statistics.

== Education and career ==
Cao studied applied mathematics at Qingdao University, graduating in 1997, and received a master's degree in economics at Xiamen University in 2000. She completed a Ph.D. in statistics in 2005 at the University of Missouri. Her dissertation, Bayesian Hierarchical Modeling in Nest Survival Studies, was supervised by Zhuoqiong He.

She joined Southern Methodist University as an assistant professor of statistical science in 2005. She was promoted to associate professor in 2011 and full professor in 2021.

== Recognition ==
Cao was named as a Fellow of the American Association of Wine Economists (AAWE) in 2017, after previously winning a best presentation award at an AAWE conference and publishing several papers on the statistics of wine tasting.

She was elected to the 2025 class of Fellows of the American Statistical Association.
