= Christina Paxson =

American economist

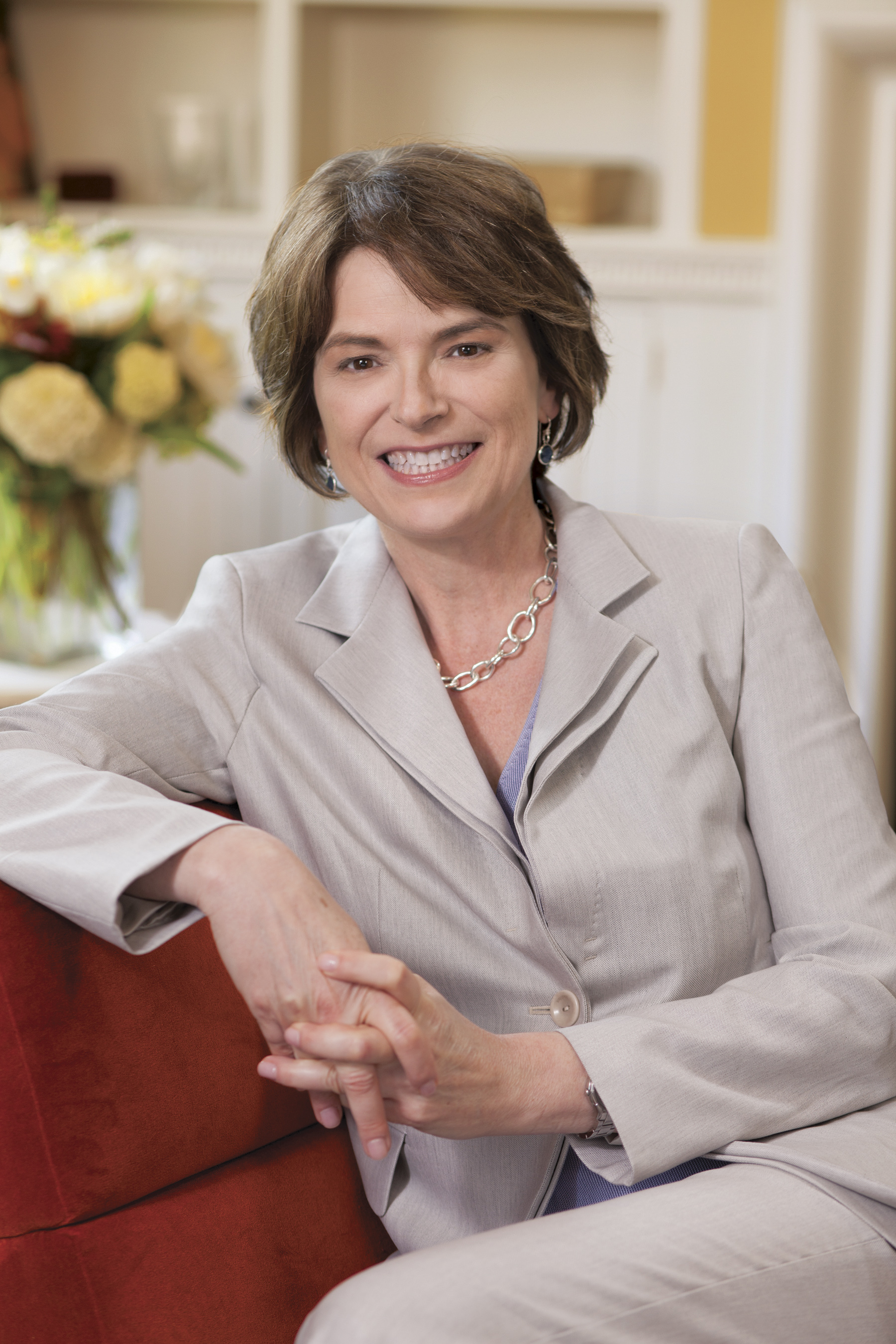
- Paxson in 2012

19th President of Brown University
- Incumbent
- Assumed office July 1, 2012
- Preceded by: Ruth Simmons

Personal details
- Born: Christina Hull Paxson; February 6, 1960 (age 66)
- Children: 2
- Education: Swarthmore College (BA); Columbia University (MA, PhD)

Academic background
- Thesis: Three essays in economics: Borrowing constraints and hours constraints (1987)
- Doctoral advisor: Joseph Altonji

Academic work
- Discipline: Economics
- Institutions: Princeton University; Brown University

Christina Hull Paxson (born February 6, 1960) is an American economist who has been the 19th president of Brown University since July 2012. In August 2026, she announced her intent to depart from Brown at the end of the 2026–27 academic year, though she plans to remain involved in the local community. She previously served as dean of the Princeton School of Public and International Affairs at Princeton University.

== Early life and education ==
Paxson spent her childhood in Forest Hills, a suburb of Pittsburgh.

In 1982, Paxson received a Bachelor of Arts from Swarthmore College, where she majored in economics and minored in English and philosophy. She was a member of the Phi Beta Kappa honor society.

Pursuing graduate studies at Columbia University, Paxson transferred from the Columbia Business School to the Columbia Graduate School of Arts and Sciences, receiving a Master of Arts in 1985 and a Doctor of Philosophy in economics in 1987, with a focus on labor. Paxson was advised by Joseph Altonji, and her dissertation analyzed the effects of consumer interest rates on the consumer credit market.

== Career ==
In 2000, Paxson founded the Center for Health and Wellbeing at Princeton University, an interdisciplinary research center based in the Woodrow Wilson School. She served as the chair of Princeton's Economics Department in academic year 2008–09. Paxson was also the founding director of an NIA Center for the Economics and Demography of Aging at Princeton. During her time at Princeton, Paxson also served as a visiting professor at the University of Pennsylvania's Wharton School.

Paxson's research focuses on the impact of childhood health and circumstances on economic and health outcomes over the lifecourse; the impact of the AIDS crisis on children's health and education in Africa; and the long run consequences of Hurricane Katrina on the mental and physical health of vulnerable populations. Paxson has been a Senior Editor of The Future of Children, an interdisciplinary journal that works to build a bridge between cutting edge social science research and the policy community.

=== Brown University ===
Christina Paxson at Brown

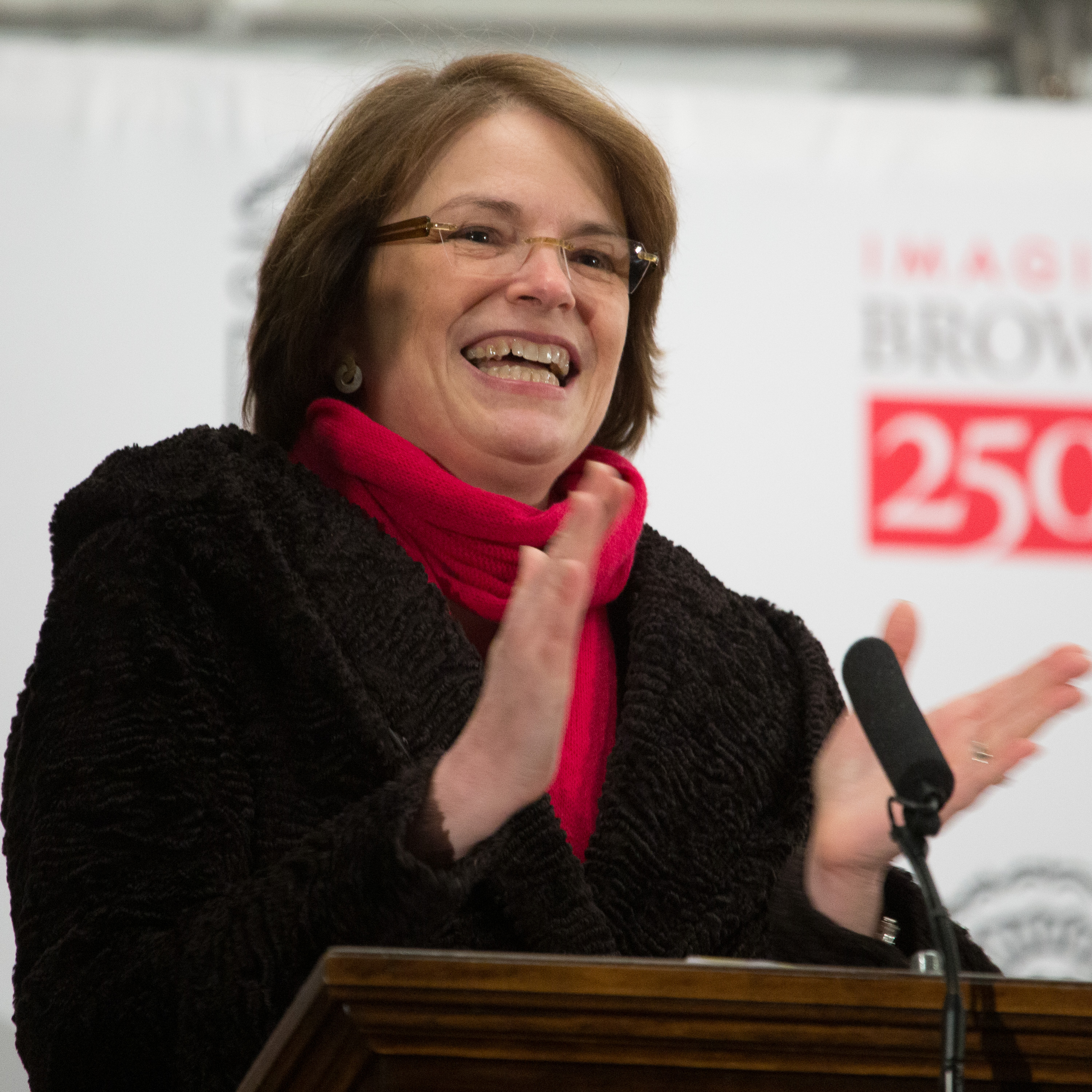
Paxson presided over Brown's 250th anniversary celebration in 2014

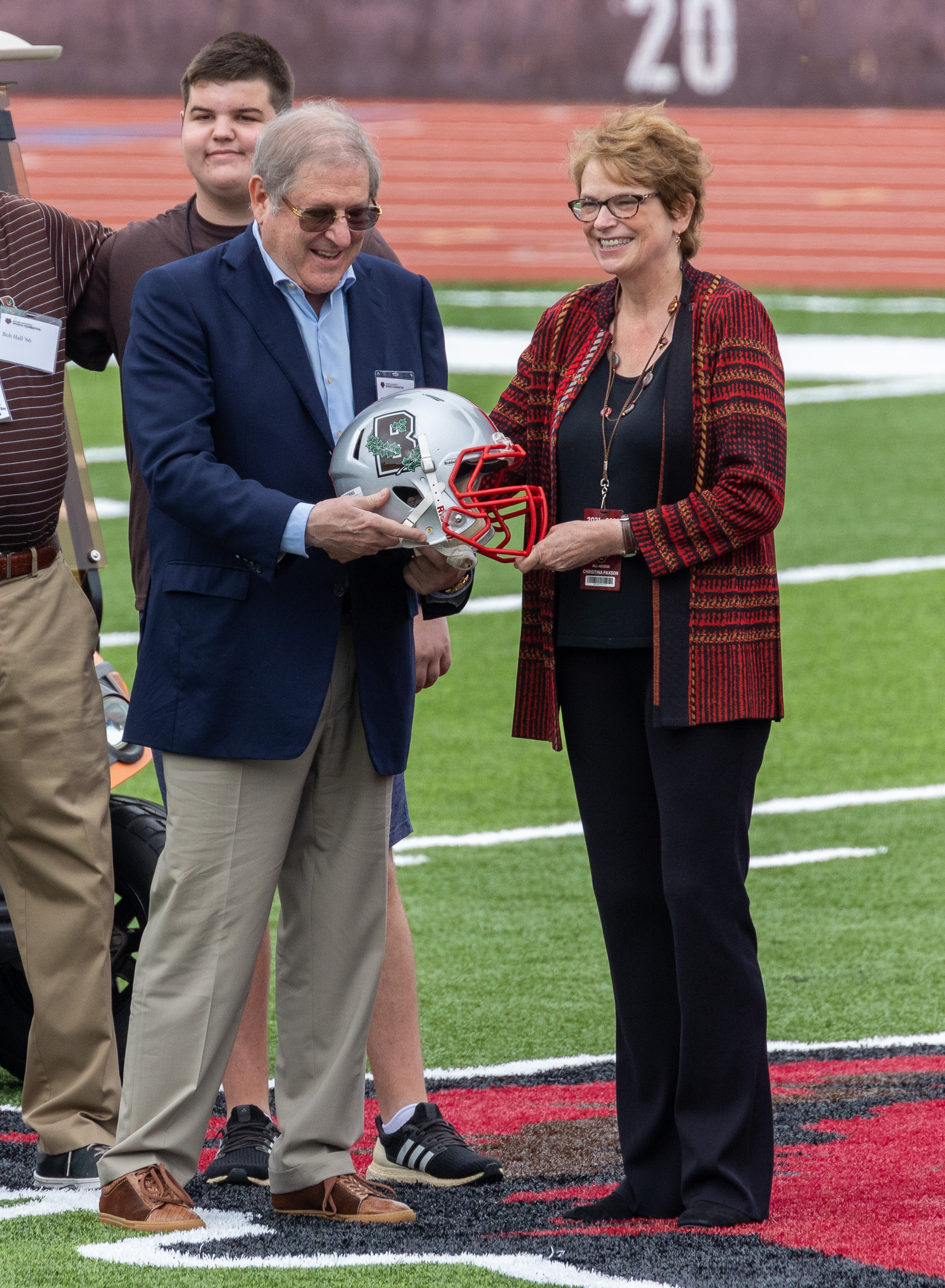
Honoring Richard I. Gouse '68, primary donor of the Richard Gouse Field at Brown Stadium, in 2021

Paxson sustained undergraduate financial aid as the fastest-growing area of Brown's budget by increasing scholarships for low-income families and eliminating loans from university-awarded financial aid packages, as part of The Brown Promise, in addition to Brown's Pathways to Diversity and Inclusion action plan.

Under Paxson's leadership, the University has established a School of Public Health as well as a number of centers and institutes including the Brown Arts Institute, the Brown Institute for Translational Science, the Data Science Initiative, and the Nelson Center for Entrepreneurship.

Paxson has overseen an expansion of Brown's academic, performing arts, and residential facilities. Expansion of Brown's physical footprint under Paxson's leadership has been controversial, at times spurring criticism from community organizations and preservation groups.

In 2019, she told the university that she would not implement a BDS platform after a student passed referendum in favor of such, with 27.5% of students voting. She also said she could not make public the details of the university's investments.

A fall 2021 poll by The Brown Daily Herald found that 47.1% of surveyed students "strongly" or "somewhat" disapproved of Paxson's leadership while 32.8% "strongly" or "somewhat" approved. The publication's fall 2017 poll placed Paxson's approval rating at 61.9%.

== Social engagement ==
In 2013, Paxson wrote a New Republic op-ed arguing for the humanities' ongoing relevance from an economist's perspective. She has also maintained other institutional affiliations: in addition to being a member of the Council on Foreign Relations, she was elected to the American Academy of Arts and Sciences in 2017.

In 2016, Paxson joined the board of directors of the Federal Reserve Bank of Boston. After serving as its deputy chair, she became chair in 2021.

In 2018, Paxson received an honorary doctorate from Williams College.

In wake of the COVID-19 pandemic, Paxson wrote a New York Times op-ed and appeared on CNN to give her views on the importance of reopening colleges safely in the fall of 2020. On June 4, 2020, she testified before the United States Senate Committee on Health, Education, Labor and Pensions, during a hearing titled "COVID-19: Going Back to College Safely."

== Personal life ==
Paxson is married to Ari Gabinet. They have two children. Raised as a Quaker, she converted to her husband's Jewish faith.

== Selected publications ==
- "Stature and Status: Height, Ability, and Labor Market Outcomes" (with Anne Case), Journal of Political Economy, 116(3): 499–532, June 2008.
- "Racial Disparities in Childhood Asthma in the US: Evidence from the National Health Interview Survey, 1997–2003" (with Marla McDaniel and Jane Waldfogel), Pediatrics 117(5): e868-e877, May 2006.
- "Orphans in Africa: Parental Death, Poverty and School Enrollment" (with Anne Case and Joseph Ableidinger), Demography 41(3), pp. 483–508, August 2004.
- "Economic Status and Health in Childhood: The Origins of the Gradient" (with Anne Case and Darren Lubotsky), American Economic Review 92(5), December 2002.
- "Economies of Scale, Household Size, and the Demand for Food" (with Angus Deaton), Journal of Political Economy 106(5): 897–930, October 1998.
- "Intertemporal Choice and Inequality" (with Angus Deaton), Journal of Political Economy 102(3): 437–467, 1994.
- "Consumption and Income Seasonality in Thailand," Journal of Political Economy 101(1): 39–72, February 1993.
- "Using Weather Variability to Estimate the Response of Savings to Transitory Income in Thailand," American Economic Review 82(1), March 1992.
- "Causes and Consequences of Early Life Health" (with Anne Case) Demography 47(1): S65-S85, March 2010.
- "The Long Reach of Childhood Health and Circumstance: Evidence from the Whitehall II Study" (with Anne Case), Economic Journal, Royal Economic Society 121(554): F183-F204, 2008.
- "The Impact of the AIDS Pandemic on Health Services in Africa: Evidence from Demographic and Health Surveys" (With Anne Case), Demography 48(2): 675–697, May 2009.
- "Making Sense of the Labor Market Height Premium: Evidence From the British Household Panel Survey" (With Anne Case and Mahnaz Islam), Economics Letters 102(3): 174–176, March 2008.
- "The Income Gradient in Children's Health: A Comment on Currie, Shields and Wheatley Price" (With Anne Case & Diana Lee), Journal of Health Economics 27(3), 801–807, October 2007
- "Socioeconomic Status and Health in Childhood: A Comment on Chen, Martin and Matthews" (With Anne Case & Tom Vogl), Social Science & Medicine, 189-214
- "From Cradle to Grave? The Lasting Impact of Childhood Health and Circumstance" (With Anne Case & Angela Fertig), Journal of Health Economics 24(2), 365-389.

Academic offices
Preceded by Ruth Simmons	19th President of Brown University; July 1, 2012–present	Incumbent
Preceded by Anne-Marie Slaughter	Dean; Woodrow Wilson School; Princeton University; 2009-2012	Succeeded by Cecilia Rouse
