= Robert LaLonde =

American economist

Robert John LaLonde (1958–2018) was an American economist who specialized in the fields of labor economics and econometrics.

== Early life ==
He grew up in Syracuse, NY and attended Westhill High School. He received his A.B. degree from the University of Chicago in 1980. He then attended Princeton University, where he received his Ph.D. in 1985 under the supervision of Orley Ashenfelter.

== Academic career ==
His own Ph.D. students included Brian Jacob. He joined the faculty of the University of Chicago in 1985 as Associate Professor of Industrial Relations at the Graduate School of Business and was a Visiting Associate Professor of The Harris Graduate School of Public Policy Studies from 1994-1995. In 1986, LaLonde published an influential article comparing nonexperimental estimates to experimental benchmarks. In 1995, LaLonde joined Michigan State University as an Associate Professor of Economics for three years. In 1999, he went on to spend the remainder of his professional career at the University of Chicago, where he was professor and director of the Ph.D. program in the Harris School of Public Policy. In addition to his academic appointments, he was a research fellow at the National Bureau of Economic Research in 1986, and was a senior staff economist at the Council of Economic Advisers from 1987 to 1988. He joined the IZA Institute of Labor Economics as a research fellow in 2001.

He died on January 17, 2018, after a long illness. He was honored with a conference held by the Federal Reserve Bank of Chicago in 2018.
