= Hartley's test =

In statistics, Hartley's test, also known as the F_{max} test or Hartley's F_{max}, is used in the analysis of variance to verify that different groups have a similar variance, an assumption needed for other statistical tests. It was developed by H. O. Hartley, who published it in 1950.

The test involves computing the ratio of the largest group variance, max(s_{j}^{2}) to the smallest group variance, min(s_{j}^{2}). The resulting ratio, F_{max}, is then compared to a critical value from a table of the sampling distribution of F_{max}. If the computed ratio is less than the critical value, the groups are assumed to have similar or equal variances.

Hartley's test assumes that data for each group are normally distributed, and that each group has an equal number of members. This test, although convenient, is quite sensitive to violations of the normality assumption. Alternatives to Hartley's test that are robust to violations of normality are O'Brien's procedure, and the Brown–Forsythe test.

== Related tests ==
Hartley's test is related to Cochran's C test in which the test statistic is the ratio of max(s_{j}^{2}) to the sum of all the group variances. Other tests related to these, have test statistics in which the within-group variances are replaced by the within-group range. Hartley's test and these similar tests, which are easy to perform but are sensitive to departures from normality, have been grouped together as quick tests for equal variances and, as such, are given a commentary by Hand & Nagaraja (2003).

== See also ==
- Bartlett's test
- Brown–Forsythe test
