= Trevor S. Breusch =

Australian economist (born 1953)

- Born: c. 1953 (age 72–73)

Academic background
- Education: Australian National University

Academic work
- Discipline: Econometrics
- Institutions: Crawford School of Public Policy
- Notable ideas: Breusch–Pagan test Breusch–Godfrey test
- Website: Information at IDEAS / RePEc

Trevor Stanley Breusch (born c. 1953) is an Australian econometrician and was until his retirement Professor of Econometrics and Deputy Director of Crawford School of Public Policy at the Australian National University. He is noted for the Breusch–Pagan test from the paper (with Adrian Pagan) "A simple test for heteroscedasticity and random coefficient variation" (see Noted works, below). Another contribution to econometrics is the serial correlation Lagrange multiplier test, often called Breusch–Godfrey test after Breusch and Leslie G. Godfrey, which can be used to identify autocorrelation in the errors of a regression model.

== Awards ==
- Australian Finance Conference Prize in Economics, University of Queensland, 1973.
- University of Queensland Medal, 1975.
- Fellow of the Econometric Society, 1991.

== Noted works ==
- Breusch, T. S.; Pagan, A. R. (1979). "A Simple Test for Heteroscedasticity and Random Coefficient Variation". Econometrica. 47 (5): 1287–1294. doi:10.2307/1911963. JSTOR 1911963.
- Breusch, T. S. (1979). "Testing for Autocorrelation in Dynamic Linear Models". Australian Economic Papers. 17 (31): 334–355. doi:10.1111/j.1467-8454.1978.tb00635.x.
