= Deane Terrell =

Australian econometrician and vigneron

R. Deane Terrell AO
- Born: 22 April 1936 (age 90); Adelaide
- Education: University of Adelaide; Oxford University; Australian National University
- Awards: Rhodes Scholarship (1959); Officer of the Order of Australia (2002)
- Scientific career
- Fields: Statistics; Econometrics
- Workplaces: Australian National University
- Doctoral students: Adrian Pagan

Richard Deane Terrell AO (born 22 April 1936) is an Australian econometrician and vigneron, was a Rhodes scholar (1959) and Vice-Chancellor of the Australian National University (1994–2001). Terrell's other positions, affiliations, and interests are diverse and numerous.

== Early years ==
Terrell was born in Adelaide and educated at St Peter's College, Adelaide, the University of Adelaide, and was awarded a Rhodes Scholarship in 1959 where he studied for a PhD at Magdalen. Terrell completed his PhD in statistics at Australian National University in 1970.

== Affiliations, etc. ==
- Chairman, IELTS (Aust.) Pty Ltd (2002–2007)
- Chairman, AARNet Pty Ltd (2002–2011)
- Chairman, General Sir John Monash Foundation Investment Committee (2003–)
- Chairman, Board of the Sir Roland Wilson Foundation
- Chairman, Selection Committee for the Sir Roland Wilson Scholarship Program
- Chairman, Canberra Symphony Orchestra
- CEO, Quarry Hill Wines (2000–)
- Member of the Advisory Board for the Centre for Arab and Islamic Studies
- Member, General Sir John Monash Foundation and Scholarship Awards Committee

== Personal ==
Terrell married Jennifer Anne Kathleen Doman in 1961; they have two sons and a daughter.

== Honours and awards ==
Terrell is an Emeritus Professor at ANU, and was appointed an Officer of the Order of Australia (AO) in 2002 for service to higher education, particularly as a pioneer in establishing international links between Australian and overseas universities, as a leading contributor to organisations bridging the academic and business sectors, and as an administrator and educator.

Academic offices
Preceded by Lawrence Walter Nichol	9th Vice-Chancellor of the Australian National University; 1994–2000	Succeeded by Ian Chubb
