= Adrian Pagan =

Australian economist

- Born: Adrian Rodney Pagan; 12 January 1947 (age 79); Mungindi, Queensland, Australia

Academic background
- Doctoral advisor: Deane Terrell

Academic work
- Discipline: Econometrics
- Institutions: University of Sydney
- Notable ideas: Breusch–Pagan test
- Website: Information at IDEAS / RePEc

Adrian Rodney Pagan AO (born 12 January 1947 in Mungindi, Queensland) is an Australian economist and Professor of Economics in the School of Economics at the University of Sydney. From 1995 to 2000, he was a member of the board of the Reserve Bank of Australia.

== Career ==
Pagan was educated at the University of Queensland, where he gained first class honours in Economics, and completed his PhD under Deane Terrell at the Australian National University in 1972. He has held visiting and permanent appointments at ANU and at a number of universities around the world including the University of Oxford, the University of Rochester, Princeton University, Yale University, Johns Hopkins University and the University of California at Los Angeles.

== Major contributions ==
Pagan is known for work in time-series econometrics and hypothesis testing, notably including the Breusch–Pagan test for heteroscedasticity and other applications of the Lagrange multiplier test. His recent work has focused on macro-econometric modeling and its uses in policy analysis and for the explanation of business cycles.

== Honours ==
Pagan is a Fellow of the Academy of Social Sciences in Australia, the Econometric Society and the Journal of Econometrics; a Medallist Fellow of the Modelling and Simulation Society of Australia and New Zealand; and has been awarded the Distinguished Fellow Medal of the Economic Society of Australia.

At the 2015 Australia Day Honours, Pagan was appointed an Officer of the Order of Australia for distinguished service to tertiary education as an academic economist, to the development of public policy research, as an author, and through contributions to professional and financial organisations.

== See also ==
- Nicola Acocella
