= Joseph Altonji =

American economist

Joseph G. Altonji
- Born: 1953 (age 72–73); New York City, U.S.

Academic background
- Education: Yale University (BA, MA); Princeton University (PhD)
- Doctoral advisor: Orley Ashenfelter; Stephen Goldfeld

Academic work
- Discipline: Labor Economics; Macroeconomics; Applied Econometrics
- Institutions: Northwestern University; Yale University
- Doctoral students: Christina Paxson
- Website: Personal Website; Information at IDEAS / RePEc

Joseph Gerard Altonji (born 1953) is an American economist and the Thomas DeWitt Cuyler Professor of Economics at Yale University. His fields of interest include macroeconomics and applied econometrics and in particular labour economics, being ranked as one of the foremost labour economists worldwide. In 2018, his contributions to the analysis of labour supply, family economics and discrimination were rewarded with the IZA Prize in Labor Economics.

== Education ==
Joseph Altonji received his B.A. and M.A. in economics from Yale University in 1975, followed by a Ph.D. from Princeton University in 1981. After his Ph.D., Altonji became an assistant professor of economics at Columbia University before moving to an associate professorship at Northwestern University in 1986, where he was promoted to professor in 1990. In 2002, Altonji moved back to Yale University as the Thomas DeWitt Cuyler Professor of Economics, a position he still holds.

== Career ==
Besides his academic appointments, Altonji has served as consultant to the Federal Reserve Banks of Chicago and Cleveland, has been a senior fellow at NCI Research, and a consultant to the Center for Naval Analysis. Since 2002, he has been a Research Fellow at the IZA Institute of Labor Economics. He is currently a member of the Federal Economic Statistics Advisory Committee and the NSF Social, Behavior and Economic Sciences Advisory Committee. His research has been acknowledged through fellowships of the Econometric Society and the Society of Labor Economists as well as a membership in the American Academy of Arts and Sciences. In 2018, Altonji won the IZA Prize for Labor Economics.

== Research ==
Joseph Altonji's research interests include "labour market fluctuations, labour supply, consumption behaviour, the economics of education, economic links among family members, race and gender in the labour market, wage determination, and econometric methods". Altonji ranks among the top 1% of economists registered on IDEAS/RePEc in terms of research output. In 2021, a special issue of the Journal of Labor Economics was devoted to Altonji's work.

=== Research on labour supply ===
Joseph Altonji's first field of research have been the economics of labour supply. In a seminal 1982 paper, he analysed whether aggregate fluctuations in (un-)employment can be explained as intertemporal substitution in labour supply, as hypothesized by e.g. Robert E. Lucas, and found the model to be rejected in the data. In another analysis of the sensitivity of the labour supply to intertemporal wage variation, Altonji uses either consumption data or a first-difference approach to control for wealth and wage expectations and finds the intertemporal elasticity of wage substitution for married men to be positive and small. Further work on the labour supply was later produced in the 1990s with Christina Paxson, with whom Altonji found that the effects of changes in the demographic structure of the family on wives' work hours are generally much larger for wives who change employers, supporting the perspective that job changes following shifts in labour supply preferences (e.g. due to motherhood) may provide the opportunity to reduce discrepancies between desired and actual working hours. In another study with Paxson on this topic, they find that workers require compensation to work in a job that, given the worker's particular preferences, offers unattractive working hours.

=== Economics of education and training ===
Some of Altonji's earliest work in the economics of education and training studied the effect of high school curricula. For instance, jointly with James Spletzer, he studied the link between the receipt of on-the-job training and the characteristics of workers and jobs in the U.S. in the 1970s, for which they found no relationship between high school curriculum and training, but instead - among else - a negative link between training intensity and duration, women to be more likely to receive training than men but overall receiving less training time, and post-secondary education to make subsequent training more probable. Subsequent work on high school curricula by Altonji found the return to additional courses in academic subjects to be small. Further research by Altonji on the demand for and return to high school and postsecondary by field of study is reviewed in his survey of the literature (co-authored with Erica Blom and Costas Meghir). In two studies with Thomas Dunn using the PSID and NLS, Altonji finds that teachers' salary, expenditures per pupil and a composite index of school quality indicators have a substantial positive effect on the wages of U.S. high school graduates, but mixed results regarding whether parental education has a positive impact on children's returns to education. Together with Todd Elder and Christopher Taber, Joseph Altonji has notably analysed the effect of attending a Catholic high school, finding that they substantially increase the likelihood of graduating from high school and possibly also of college attendance, though with scant effect on test scores. As part of this analysis, Altonji, Elder and Taber exploited a presumed link between selections on observed and on unobserved variables and later used their results to develop an assessment method for instrumental variable strategies. Finally, although most of Altonji's return in education economics is empirical, he has also contributed to its theory, most importantly through his analysis of the demand for and return to education face to uncertain education outcomes.

=== Research on family economics ===
Another field of research of Altonji is the economic analysis of the family, especially in joint work with Laurence Kotlikoff and Fumio Hayashi as well as with Thomas Dunn. Together with Hayashi and Kotlikoff, Altonji finds that, within the extended family in the U.S., the distribution of consumption is independent of the distribution of resources, suggesting that members of an extended family are not altruistically linked. Exploring the effects of income and wealth on time and money transfers between parents and children further, they find that money transfers tend to reduce inequality in household incomes but that income differences poorly predict time transfers, with richer siblings giving more to parents and receive less; overall, the results call for more sophisticated exchange models of transfers. Another finding is that risk sharing between or within U.S. American families is incomplete. In later work, Altonji, Hayashi and Kotlikoff renew their rejection of the altruism hypothesis, finding in their research on parental altruism and inter vivos transfers that redistributing one dollar from a recipient child to donor parents leads to a "trickle down" of only 13%, far less than what would be expected under altruism (100%). More recently, together with Dunn, Altonji has studied the relationships among the family incomes and labour market outcomes of relatives.

=== Research on discrimination and migration ===
Altonji has also made substantial contributions to the field of labour market discrimination, especially through his comprehensive survey of the literature on race and gender in the labour market (with Rebecca Blank). Another seminal study is due to Altonji and Charles Pierret, who show that if firms statistically discriminate among young workers on the basis of easily observable characteristics, the coefficients on the easily observed variables should fall and the coefficients on hard-to-observe correlates of productivity should rise, as firms learn about workers' productivity. More recently, in work with Ulrich Doraszelski, Altonji has studied the role of permanent income and demographics regarding the wealth differences between blacks and whites in the U.S. Finally, besides his work on discrimination, Altonji has also analysed the effects of immigration on the labour outcomes of less-skilled natives in the U.S. (together with David Card), finding some evidence that less-skilled natives in high-immigrant cities have moved out of immigrant-intensive industries and that an inflow of immigrants equal to 1% may reduce the average weekly earnings of less-skilled natives by about 1.2%.

=== Research on wages, income and consumption ===
In his research on wages, Altonji and Robert Shakotko finds that wages rise modestly with job seniority and that general labour market experience and "job shopping" account for most wage growth over a career, with the strong cross-sectional relationship between tenure and wages being mainly due to heterogeneity bias. A 2005 reestimation by Altonji and Nicolas Williams yielded an estimate of 10 years of tenure increasing the log wage by 0.11, suggesting that the return to tenure has likely grown over time. In a paper with Aloysius Siow, Altonji tests the rational expectations lifecycle model of consumption against a Keynesian model and the rational expectations lifecycle model with imperfect capital markets, finding the evidence to reject the Keynesian model but yielding inconclusive results as to whether the assumption of perfect capital markets is necessary or not. In a study with Paul Devereux, Altonji studies to what extent nominal wages are downwardly rigid and what effect such rigidities have on wage levels, wage changes, and labour market transitions. Most recently, Altonji, Anthony Smith Jr. and Ivan Vidangos used indirect inference to estimate a joint model of earnings, employment, job changes, wage rates, and work hours over a career, finding that human capital is responsible for most of earnings growth over a career, though with important roles for job seniority and mobility, and that unemployment shocks have substantial impacts on earnings in both the short and long run.

=== Other research ===
Further major research by Altonji has addressed small-sample bias in GMM estimation of covariance structures (with Lewis Segal), cross section and panel data estimators for nonseparable models with endogenous regressors (with Rosa Matzkin), and the implications of changes in the characteristics of American youth for adult outcomes (with Prashant Bharadwaj and Fabian Lange).
