= James B. Ramsey =

American econometrician (1937–2025)

- Born: September 9, 1937
- Died: March 31, 2021 (aged 83)

Academic background
- Education: University of Wisconsin–Madison; University of British Columbia

Academic work
- Discipline: Econometrics
- Institutions: New York University
- Notable ideas: Ramsey RESET test

James Bernard Ramsey (September 9, 1937 – March 31, 2021) was an American econometrician. He was a professor of economics at New York University, and was chair of the economics department between 1978 and 1987.

Ramsey attended Chigwell School in England between 1949 and 1954. He later received his B.A. in mathematics and economics from the University of British Columbia in 1963, and his M.A. and Ph.D. in economics from the University of Wisconsin–Madison in 1968 with the thesis "Tests for Specification Errors in Classical Linear Least Squares Regression Analysis", which was later partially published in the Journal of the Royal Statistical Society. It contained the RESET test for misspecification of an econometric model.

After briefly serving as professor at University of Birmingham, England, and Michigan State University, Ramsey moved to New York University as professor of economics and chair of the economics department between 1978 and 1987, where he remained for 37 years until his retirement in 2013.

Ramsey has been called the Father of Wavelets in Economics, for his pioneering work on the use of nonlinear dynamics, stochastic processes, time series, and wavelet analysis in economics. His fondness for chaos theory extended into his personal life: he named his boat "The Strange Attractor".

Ramsey died on March 31, 2021, aged 83.
