= Orley Ashenfelter =

American economist

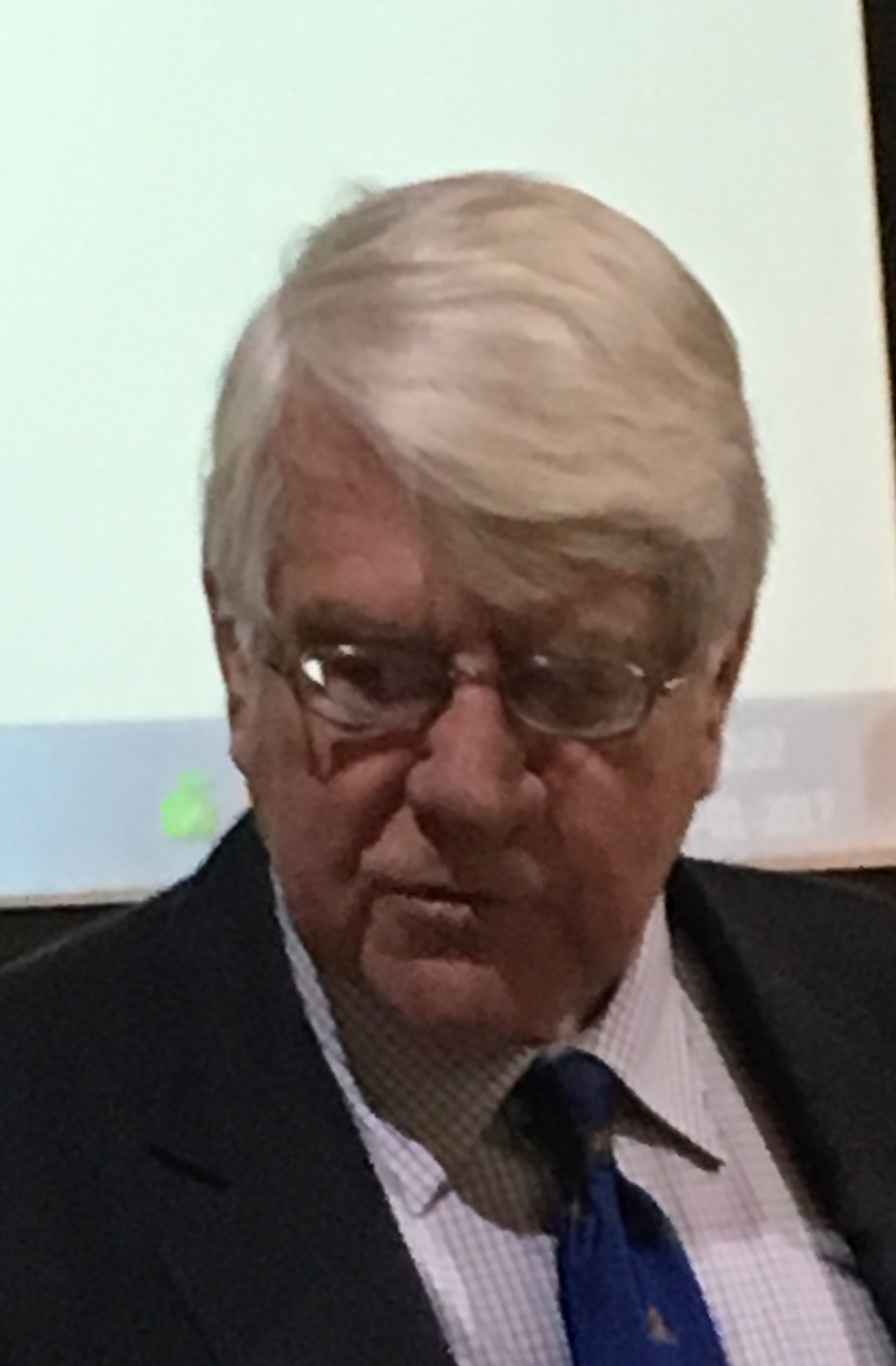
- Born: October 18, 1942 (age 84); San Francisco, California, US

Academic background
- Education: Claremont McKenna College; Princeton University (PhD)
- Doctoral advisor: Albert Rees; Stephen Goldfeld

Academic work
- Discipline: Labor economics, applied econometrics
- Institutions: Princeton University
- Doctoral students: Robert LaLonde; John Driffill; Henry Farber; Joseph Altonji; David E. Bloom; David Card; Janet Currie; Joshua Angrist
- Awards: Jacob Mincer Award (2005); IZA Prize in Labor Economics (2003); Frisch Medal (1982)
- Website: Information at IDEAS / RePEc

Orley Clark Ashenfelter (born October 18, 1942) is an American economist and the Joseph Douglas Green 1895 Professor of Economics emeritus at Princeton University. His areas of specialization include labor economics, econometrics, and law and economics. He was influential in contributing to the applied turn in economics.

== Biography ==
Orley Ashenfelter attended most of his K-12 education in National City, a suburb of San Diego. He graduated from Sweetwater H.S., in 1960, achieving many honors there. Born in San Francisco, Ashenfelter attended Claremont McKenna Men's College. Ashenfelter received a Ph.D. in economics from Princeton University in 1970, having completed a doctoral dissertation titled "Racial discrimination and labor markets". He has been director of the Office of Evaluation of the U.S. Department of Labor, a Guggenheim Fellow, and the Benjamin Meaker Visiting Professor at the University of Bristol. He was awarded the Frisch Medal in 1982. He is a recipient of the IZA Prize in Labor Economics, the Mincer Award for Lifetime Achievement of the Society of Labor Economists, a Fellow of the Econometric Society, the American Academy of Arts and Sciences, the Society of Labor Economics, and a Corresponding Fellow of the Royal Society of Edinburgh. He also served as editor of the American Economic Review. He analyzed the results of the Judgment of Paris wine tasting event with Richard E. Quandt. He was elected a Fellow of the American Academy of Arts and Sciences in 1993. He is currently President of the American Association of Wine Economists and an editor of the Journal of Wine Economics. Orley Ashenfelter has provided expert economic testimony in numerous legal cases, including U.S. v. Apple (which focused on price-fixing in the market for eBooks), and the 1997 review of the proposed merger between Office Depot and Staples Inc. In 1998, he and Richard Posner co-founded American Law and Economics Review, and served jointly as editors-in-chief from then until 2005.

== Charles University ==
Since the early 1990s, Ashenfelter has actively participated in the process of restoration of doctoral education and research in economics in the Czech Republic. Since 1999, he has been on the board of directors of the CERGE-EI Foundation, which aims to foster economics education in the region and which supports the doctoral program in economics at CERGE-EI, the joint workplace of the Center for Economic Research and Graduate Education (CERGE) of Charles University, Prague, and of the Economics Institute (EI) of the Academy of Sciences of the Czech Republic. Between 2001 and 2007 he has also been a member of the Executive and Supervisory Committee of CERGE-EI.

The Scientific Council of the Faculty of Social Sciences awarded him an Honorary Doctorate of Charles University in Prague on the January 15, 2014.

== Awards ==
- 1977 Fellow, Econometric Society
- 1984 Ragnar Frisch Prize, Econometric Society
- 1993 Fellow, American Academy of Arts & Sciences
- 2002 Doctoral Honoris Causa, University of Brussels
- 2003 IZA Prize in Labor Economics
- 2005 Jacob Mincer Award, The Society of Labour Economists (SOLE)
- 2005 Corresponding Fellow, Royal Society of Edinburgh
- 2007 Karel Englis Medal, Academy of Sciences of the Czech Republic
- 2008 Distinguished Fellow, American Economic Association
- 2010 LERA 2010 Academic Fellow
- 2014 Honorary Doctorate, Charles University
- 2017 American Philosophical Society member
- 2018 National Academy of Sciences member

Academic offices
| Preceded by Robert Hall | President of the American Economic Association; 2011– 2012 | Succeeded by Christopher A. Sims |
