= Richard E. Quandt =

Hungarian-American economist

- Born: Richard Emeric Quandt; June 1, 1930 (age 96); Budapest, Hungary

Academic background
- Education: Princeton University (BA); Harvard University (PhD)
- Doctoral advisor: Wassily Leontief

Academic work
- Discipline: Econometrics
- Institutions: Princeton University

Richard Emeric Quandt (born 1 June 1930, in Budapest) is a Guggenheim Fellowship-winning economist who analyzed the results of the Judgment of Paris wine tasting event with Orley Ashenfelter.

Quandt served as a professor of economics at Princeton University. In 1979 he was elected as a Fellow of the American Statistical Association. He was elected to the American Philosophical Society in 1991 and the American Academy of Arts and Sciences in 1994. He is current senior adviser to the Andrew W. Mellon Foundation.

Quandt is a member of the American Association of Wine Economists and editor of their journal, the Journal of Wine Economics. In 2012, he was involved in organizing a blind tasting event comparing wines produced in France with several wines produced in New Jersey held at Princeton University and known as the "Judgment of Princeton."

He received a B.A. from Princeton University and a Ph.D. from Harvard University.

== See also ==
- Goldfeld–Quandt test

== Published works ==
- The Changing Landscape in Eastern Europe: A Personal Perspective on Philanthropy and Technology Transfer Oxford University Press 2002 ISBN 0-19-514669-7
- (with Andrew Lass). Library automation in transitional societies: lessons from Eastern Europe. New York: Oxford University Press, 2000. ISBN 0-19-513262-9.
- The Collected Essays of Richard E. Quandt (Economists of the Twentieth Century) Edward Elgar Publishing 1992 ISBN 1-85278-605-1
- Racetrack Betting: The Professor's Guide to Strategies Praeger Paperback 1991 ISBN 0-275-94103-5
- (with James M. Henderson). Microeconomic Theory: A Mathematical Approach Mcgraw-Hill College 1980 ISBN 0-07-028101-7
