= Herman Otto Hartley =

German-American statistician (1912–1980)

H.O. Hartley
- Born: Hermann Otto Hirschfeld; April 13, 1912; Berlin, Germany
- Died: December 30, 1980 (aged 68); Durham, North Carolina
- Education: University of Berlin; University of Cambridge; University College London
- Known for: Pearson Hartley Biometrika Tables, Greenwood Hartley Guide to Tables in Mathematical Statistics, mathematical foundations for correspondence analysis, pioneer in the use of EM algorithm, F-max test, survey sampling, mathematical programming and optimization, estimation of variance components, analysis of incomplete data, stochastic PERT
- Awards: Wilks Memorial Award (1973); Fellow of Institute of Mathematical Statistics (1949); Fellow of American Statistical Association (1953); Elected Member of International Statistics Institute; President, Eastern North American Region International Biometric Society (1959); President, American Statistical Association (1979)
- Scientific career
- Fields: Statistics, mathematics
- Institutions: Harper Adams Agricultural College; Scientific Computing Service; University College London; Iowa State University; Texas A&M University; Duke University
- Thesis: Calculus of Variations and Optimal Control; Statistical Distribution Functions; (1934 and 1940)
- Doctoral advisor: Adolf Hammerstein (in Berlin); John Wishart (in Cambridge)
- Doctoral students: George Box; Herbert A. David

Herman Otto Hartley (born Hermann Otto Hirschfeld in Berlin, Germany; 1912–1980) was a German American statistician. He made significant contributions in many areas of statistics, mathematical programming, and optimization. He also founded Texas A&M University's Department of Statistics.

Hartley's earliest papers appeared under the name H.O. Hirschfeld. He translated his German last name Hirschfeld (Hirsch = Hart, Feld = field = lea = ley) into English.

== Career ==
In 1934, at the age of 22, Hartley earned a Ph.D. in mathematics from the University of Berlin, followed by a Ph.D. in mathematical statistics from the University of Cambridge in 1940 and a Doctorate of Science in mathematical statistics from University College London in 1954. He began his independent academic career at UCL, where he met Egon Pearson, with whom he collaborated to produce the classic two-volume Biometrika Tables for Statisticians, and also developed Hartley's F-max test for equality of variances.

A one-year Visiting Research Professor in Statistics position at then-Iowa State College brought Hartley to the United States in 1953. The position was extended after that initial year to include nine more years, during which he became involved in research and teaching. He was involved in instituting computing both for scientific and administrative purposes at Iowa State, which for the first time had university-wide service in data processing and numerical analysis. He also was a consultant on statistics to a wide variety of scientists on campus.

After a decade at Iowa State, Hartley moved to Texas A&M University, where he was appointed in 1963 as a distinguished professor and founding director of the Institute of Statistics. He led the Graduate Institute of Statistics, which had been formed a year earlier. In the ensuing decade and a half, he built his initial faculty of four into a group of 16, directed more than 30 doctoral students, and attracted significant research funding.

Hartley remained active at Texas A&M until 1979, when he accepted a full-time visiting professor position at Duke University while also serving as statistician with the National Testing Service in Durham, N.C., until his death on December 30, 1980.

Hartley was an elected fellow of the Institute of Mathematical Statistics (1949) and the American Statistical Association (1953) as well as an elected member of the International Statistical Institute (1954). He served as president of the Eastern North American Region of the Biometric Society (1959), which was the first region formed in the present-day International Biometric Society, and as president of the American Statistical Association (1979). Hartley earned the ASA's 1973 Wilks Memorial Award recognizing his national and international efforts in the field of statistics.

== Research ==
Hartley published nearly 100 papers (three-quarters of them during the final two decades of his career) in top-tiered journals until his mandatory retirement in 1977.

Hartley's most well-known work includes:

- Biometrika Tables for Statisticians with E. Pearson in 1954 and 1972
- The origination of the EM Algorithm methodology while at Iowa State in 1958. Today it is one of the most widely used estimation methods.
- Hartley's F-max Test for equality of variances

He also made contributions to:

- Politz-Simmons Estimator, which is a method for dealing with bias due to "not at home" entries in survey sampling.
- Hartley-Ross Estimator, which aims to estimate the mean of finite population of size N with the help of a known mean of a correlated variable. Unbiasedness proved and variance given.
- RHC Sampling Scheme, which estimates the population total using an unequal-probability sampling without replacement from a finite population
- Correspondence analysis, which is similar to principal component analysis but as applied to categorical data.

Hartley's other research spanned a variety of topics, including:

- Sample survey estimation and design
- Mathematical optimization
- Variance component estimation
- Stochastic PERT
- The development of designed experiments to estimate safe doses of carcinogenic agents

== Legacy ==
Hartley's legacy at Texas A&M includes the H.O. Hartley Award presented annually for the past 40 years to a statistics former student who best reflects Hartley's tradition of distinguished service to the discipline, the biannual Hartley Memorial Lecture Series also named in his honor, and the H.O. Hartley Chair in Statistics, established in July 2019 by his students and the Thomas W. Powell '62 Endowed Graduate Fellowship Fund.
