= Glejser test =

Glejser test for heteroscedasticity, developed in 1969 by Herbert Glejser, is a statistical test, which regresses the residuals on the explanatory variable that is thought to be related to the heteroscedastic variance. After it was found not to be asymptotically valid under asymmetric disturbances, similar improvements have been independently suggested by Im, and Machado and Santos Silva.

== Steps for using the Glejser method ==
Step 1: Estimate original regression with ordinary least squares and find the sample residuals e_{i}.

Step 2: Regress the absolute value |e_{i}| on the explanatory variable that is associated with the heteroscedasticity.

$$\begin{align}
|e_i| & = \gamma_0 + \gamma_1 X_i + v_i \\[8pt]
|e_i| & = \gamma_0 + \gamma_1 \sqrt{X_i} + v_i \\[8pt]
|e_i| & = \gamma_0 + \gamma_1 \frac 1 {X_i} + v_i
\end{align}$$

Step 3: Select the equation with the highest R^{2} and lowest standard errors to represent heteroscedasticity.

Step 4: Perform a t-test on the equation selected from step 3 on γ_{1}. If γ_{1} is statistically significant, reject the null hypothesis of homoscedasticity.

== Software Implementation ==
Glejser's Test can be implemented in R software using the glejser function of the skedastic package. It can also be implemented in SHAZAM econometrics software.

== See also ==
Breusch–Pagan test
Goldfeld–Quandt test
Park test
White test
