= Park test =

Test for heteroscedasticity

In econometrics, the Park test is a test for heteroscedasticity. The test is based on the method proposed by Rolla Edward Park for estimating linear regression parameters in the presence of heteroscedastic error terms.

== Background ==
In regression analysis, heteroscedasticity refers to unequal variances of the random error terms $\epsilon_i$, such that

$$\operatorname{Var}(\epsilon_i)=E(\epsilon_i^2)-E(\epsilon_i)^2=E(\epsilon_i^2)=\sigma_i^2$$.

It is assumed that $\operatorname{E}(\epsilon_i)=0$. The above variance varies with $i$, or the $i^{th}$ trial in an experiment or the $i^{th}$case or observation in a dataset. Equivalently, heteroscedasticity refers to unequal conditional variances in the response variables $Y_i$, such that

$$\operatorname{Var}(Y_i|X_i)=\sigma_i^2$$,

again a value that depends on $i$ – or, more specifically, a value that is conditional on the values of one or more of the regressors $X$. Homoscedasticity, one of the basic Gauss–Markov assumptions of ordinary least squares linear regression modeling, refers to equal variance in the random error terms regardless of the trial or observation, such that

$\operatorname{Var}(\epsilon_i)=\sigma^2$, a constant.

=== Test description ===
Park, on noting a standard recommendation of assuming proportionality between error term variance and the square of the regressor, suggested instead that analysts 'assume a structure for the variance of the error term' and suggested one such structure:

$$\operatorname{ln}(\sigma_{\epsilon i}^2)=\operatorname{ln}(\sigma^2)=\gamma\operatorname{ln}(X_i)+v_i$$

in which the error terms $v_i$ are considered well behaved.

This relationship is used as the basis for this test.

The modeler first runs the unadjusted regression

$$Y_i=\beta_0+\beta_1X_{i1}+...+\beta_{p-1}X_{i,p-1}+\epsilon_i$$

where the latter contains p − 1 regressors, and then squares and takes the natural logarithm of each of the residuals ($\hat{\epsilon_i}$), which serve as estimators of the $\epsilon_i$. The squared residuals $\hat{\epsilon_i}^2$ in turn estimate $\sigma_{\epsilon i}^2$.

If, then, in a regression of $\ln{(\epsilon_i^2)}$ on the natural logarithm of one or more of the regressors $X_i$, we arrive at statistical significance for non-zero values on one or more of the $\hat\gamma_i$, we reveal a connection between the residuals and the regressors. We reject the null hypothesis of homoscedasticity and conclude that heteroscedasticity is present.

== See also ==
- Breusch–Pagan test
- Glejser test
- Goldfeld–Quandt test
- White test

== Notes ==
The test has been discussed in econometrics textbooks. Stephen Goldfeld and Richard E. Quandt raise concerns about the assumed structure, cautioning that the v_{i} may be heteroscedastic and otherwise violate assumptions of ordinary least squares regression.
