= Stephen Goldfeld =

American economist (1940–1995)

Stephen M. Goldfeld
- Born: August 9, 1940
- Died: August 25, 1995 (aged 55)

Academic background
- Education: Harvard University (B.A.); Massachusetts Institute of Technology (PhD)
- Doctoral advisor: Albert Ando

Academic work
- Institutions: Princeton University
- Doctoral students: Dennis Mueller; Orley Ashenfelter; Joseph Altonji
- Notable ideas: Goldfeld–Quandt test

Stephen Michael Goldfeld (August 9, 1940 – August 25, 1995) was a Princeton University economics professor and provost who served on the Council of Economic Advisers during the Carter administration.

Goldfeld received a bachelor's degree from Harvard University in 1960 at the age of twenty and a doctorate in economics from the Massachusetts Institute of Technology in 1963 at the age of twenty three, when he joined the Princeton faculty. As an academic he specialized in financial institutions and in econometrics. He was an associate editor of the American Economic Review and other major economic journals. He died in 1995 at the age of 55 of lung cancer.

== Noted publications ==
- Commercial Bank Behavior and Economic Activity. North-Holland. 1966.
- Nonlinear Methods in Econometrics. (with R. E. Quandt). North-Holland. 1971.
- The Economics of Money and Banking. (with L. V. Chandler). Harper & Row. 1981.
