= Anne Case =

American economist

Anne Catherine Case
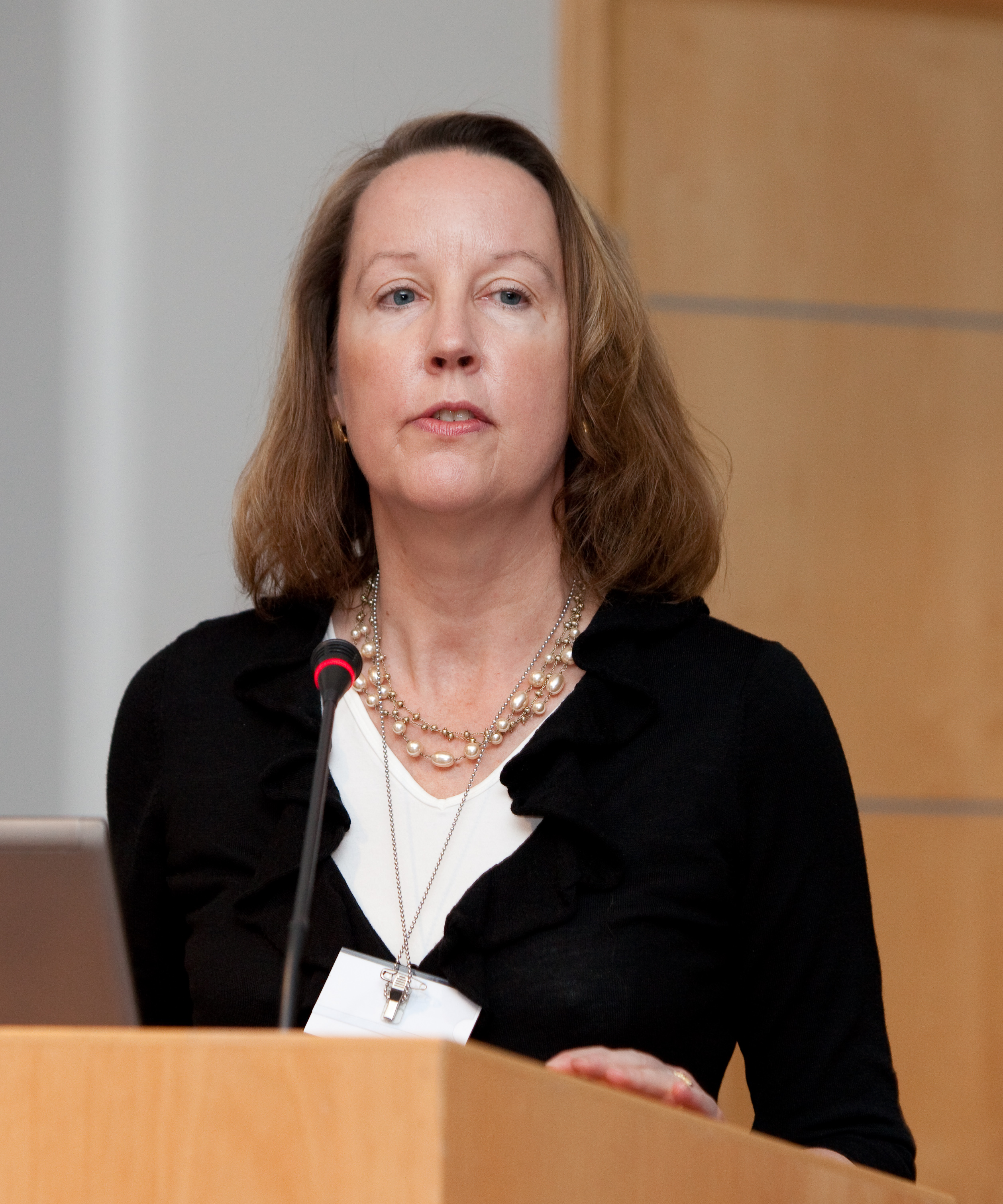
- Case in 2010
- Born: July 27, 1958 (age 68)
- Spouse: Sir Angus Deaton

Academic background
- Education: University at Albany, SUNY (BA); Princeton University (MPA, PhD)

Academic work
- Discipline: Development economics, health economics
- Doctoral students: Jonathan Morduch
- Website: Information at IDEAS / RePEc

Anne Catherine Case, Lady Deaton, (born July 27, 1958) is an American economist who is the Alexander Stewart 1886 Professor of Economics and Public Affairs, emeritus, at Princeton University.

== Early life and career ==
Case graduated with a BA degree from the State University of New York at Albany in 1980, and subsequently obtained an MPA degree in 1983 and a PhD in economics in 1988, both from Princeton University. After working as an assistant professor in the department of economics at Harvard University from 1988 to 1991, she has worked in departments of economics at Princeton University and the Woodrow Wilson School of Public and International Affairs since 1991, becoming a professor in 1997 and the Alexander Stewart 1886 Professor of Economics and Public Affairs in 2007. She currently serves as the Alexander Stewart 1886 Professor of Economics and Public Affairs Emeritus (effective as of July 1, 2017).

Her research fields include labor economics, health economics and development studies. Her research has led to the discovery that midlife mortality rates have increased for white, non-Hispanics in the U.S. with a high school diploma or less, while midlife mortality rates in other rich countries have fallen. She attributes rise in mortality rates to drugs, alcohol, and suicide, also known as "deaths of despair."

== Awards ==
In 2003, she received the Kenneth J. Arrow Award in health economics. She became a Fellow of the Econometric Society in 2009, a research fellow at the Institute for the Study of Labor (IZA) in 2012, and a member of the American Academy of Arts and Sciences, the American Philosophical Society, and the National Academy of Medicine in 2017. In 2016, she received the National Academy of Sciences Cozzarelli Prize for her work on U.S. morbidity and mortality. Case was appointed to a three-year term as a member of the President's Committee on the National Medal of Science, as well as the Committee on National Statistics. "The committee consists of 12 scientists and engineers appointed by the President to evaluate nominees for the Medal, which is given to individuals who have made outstanding contributions to knowledge in the physical, biological, mathematical, engineering, social and behavioral sciences." Case was elected as a member of the National Academy of Sciences in 2020. In 2025, Case and Angus Deaton jointly received the National Association for Business Economics' Paul A. Volcker Lifetime Achievement Award for Economic Policy.

== Publications ==
=== 2020 ===
Case, Anne, and Deaton, Angus. 2020. “Deaths of Despair and the Future of Capitalism.” Princeton University Press.

=== 2017 ===
Case, A., and T-N. Coates. 2017. “Fear and Despair: Consequences of Inequity.” Chapter 1 in Knowledge to Action. New York: Oxford University Press. Publisher's Version Case, A., and A.Deaton. 2017. “Suicide, age, and wellbeing: an empirical investigation.” NBER Working Paper 21279, Chapter 10 (pages 307–34) in Insights in the Economics of Aging. Chicago: University of Chicago Press. Case, Anne, and Angus Deaton. 2017. “Mortality and Morbidity in the 21st Century.” Brookings Papers on Economic Activity, Spring 2017.

=== 2016 ===
Ardington, C., T. Barnighausen, A. Case, and A. Menendez. 2016. “Social protection and labor market outcomes in youth in South Africa.” Industrial and Labor Relations Review 69 (2): 455–470.

=== 2015 ===
Ardington, C., and A. Case. 2015. “Health Challenges Past and Future.” Chapter 41 in The Oxford Companion to the Economics of South Africa. Oxford, UK: Oxford University Press. Case, A., and A.Deaton. 2015. “Rising morbidity and mortality in midlife among white non-Hispanic Americans in the 21st century.” Proceedings of the National Academy of Sciences 112 (49): 15078–15083. Publisher's Version

=== 2014 ===
Ardington, C., T. Barnighausen, A. Case, and A. Menendez. 2014. “The Economic Consequences of AIDS Mortality in South Africa.” Journal of Development Economics 111: 48–60.

=== 2013 ===
Case, A., and C. Paxson. 2013. “HIV Risk and Adolescent Behaviors in Africa.” American Economic Review Papers and Proceedings 103 (3): 433–438. Case, A., A. Garib, A. Menendez, and A. Olgiati. 2013. “Paying the Piper: The High Cost of Funerals in South Africa.” Economic Development and Cultural Change 62 (1): 1-20.

=== 2011 ===
Case, A., and C. Paxson. 2011. “The impact of AIDS pandemic on health services in Africa: Evidence from demographic health surveys.” Demography 48 (2): 675–697. Case, A., and A. Menendez. 2011. “Requiescat in Pace? The Consequences of High Priced Funerals in South Africa.” Chapter 11 in Explorations of Aging . Chicago : University of Chicago Press. Case, A., and A. Paxson. 2011. “The Long Reach of Childhood Health and Circumstance: Evidence from the Whitehall II Study.” The Economic Journal 121: F183-F204.

=== 2010 ===
Ardington, C., A. Case, and M. Islam. 2010. “The impact of AIDS on intergenerational support in South Africa: Evidence from the Cape Area Panel Study.” Research on Aging 32 (1): 97–121. Ardington, C., and A. Case. 2010. “Interactions Between Mental Health and Socioeconomic Status in the South African National Income Dynamics Study.” Studies in Economics and Econometrics 34 (3): 69–85. Case, A., and C. Paxson. 2010. “Causes and Consequences of Early Life Health.” Demography 47 (Supplement): S65-S85.

=== 2009 ===
Case, A., and C. Paxson. 2009. “Early Life Health and Cognitive Function in Old Age.” American Economic Review Papers and Proceedings 99 (2): 104–109. Ardington, C., A. Case, and V. Hosegood. 2009. “Labor supply responses to large social transfers: Longitudinal evidence from South Africa.” American Economic Journal: Applied Economics 1 (1): 22–48. Case, A., C. Paxson, and M. Islam. 2009. “Making Sense of the Labor Market Height Premium: Evidence from the British Household Panel Survey.” Economic Letters 102: 174–176. Case, A., and A. Menendez. 2009. “Sex Differences in Obesity Rates in Poor Countries: Evidence from South Africa.” Economics and Human Biology 7 (3): 271–282.

== Personal life ==
She is married to Nobel laureate Angus Deaton, with whom she has co-authored several papers.
