= Leslie G. Godfrey =

British econometrician (born 1946)

- Born: 1946 (age 79–80)

Academic background
- Education: University of Exeter

Academic work
- Discipline: Econometrics
- Institutions: University of York
- Notable ideas: Breusch–Godfrey test
- Website: Information at IDEAS / RePEc

Leslie George Godfrey (born 1946) is a British econometrician. The Breusch–Godfrey test is named after him and Trevor S. Breusch. He is an emeritus professor of econometrics at the University of York. He is the author of "Misspecification tests in econometrics: the Lagrange multiplier principle and other approaches" and "Bootstrap Tests for Regression Models".
