= Jeppo, Finland =

Jeppo Jeppo – Jepua
- Former municipality
- Jeppo kommun Jepuan kunta
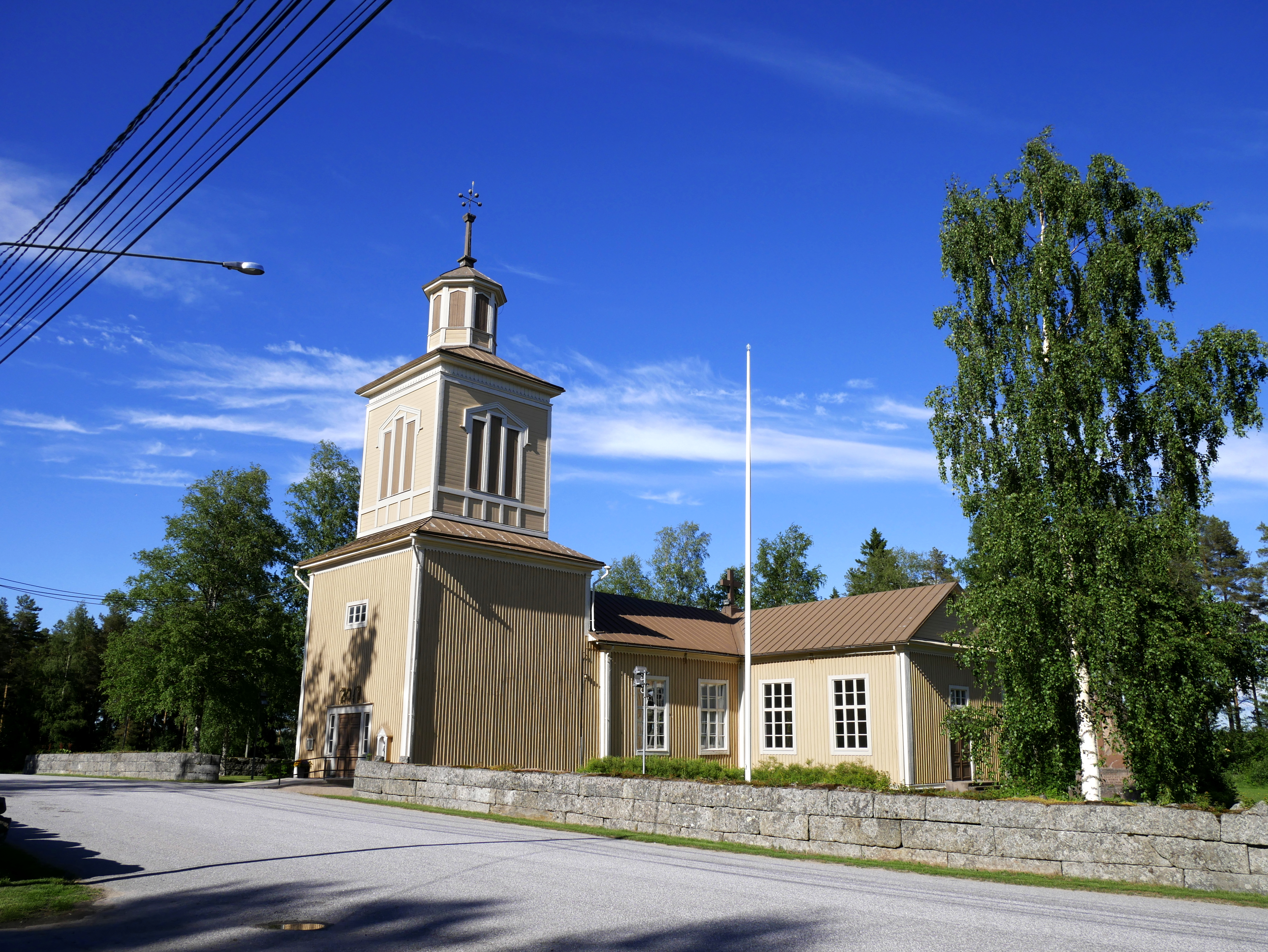
- Jeppo Church

- Coat of arms

- Location in Finland
- Coordinates: 63°24′N 22°37′E
- Country: Finland

Jeppo (Finnish: Jepua) is a former municipality of Finland, now a village of Nykarleby. The population is about 1,100; 82% of whom are Swedish-speaking.

KWH Mirka has a factory there that produces coated and non-woven abrasives.

The village is twinned with the Emmaboda Municipality, Sweden.

== History ==
The original settlement was known as Epu. In 1548 there were 189 inhabitants including 26 farmers. The church was opened in 1861. In 1970, 84.5% of inhabitants were Swedish-speaking and 15.4% Finnish-speaking, thus the former municipality was bilingual. That municipality merged into Nykarleby in 1975.
