= White test =

Statistical test

The White test is a statistical test that establishes whether the variance of the errors in a regression model is constant: that is for homoskedasticity.

This test, and an estimator for heteroscedasticity-consistent standard errors, were proposed by Halbert White in 1980. These methods have become widely used, making this paper one of the most cited articles in economics.

In cases where the White test statistic is statistically significant, heteroskedasticity may not necessarily be the cause; instead the problem could be a specification error. In other words, the White test can be a test of heteroskedasticity or specification error or both. If no cross product terms are introduced in the White test procedure, then this is a test of pure heteroskedasticity. If cross products are introduced in the model, then it is a test of both heteroskedasticity and specification bias.

== Testing constant variance ==
To test for constant variance one undertakes an auxiliary regression analysis: this regresses the squared residuals from the original regression model onto a set of regressors that contain the original regressors along with their squares and cross-products. One then inspects the R^{2}. The Lagrange multiplier (LM) test statistic is the product of the R^{2} value and sample size:

$$\text{LM} = n R^2 .$$

This follows a chi-squared distribution, with degrees of freedom equal to P − 1, where P is the number of estimated parameters (in the auxiliary regression).

The logic of the test is as follows. First, the squared residuals from the original model serve as a proxy for the variance of the error term at each observation. (The error term is assumed to have a mean of zero, and the variance of a zero-mean random variable is just the expectation of its square.) The independent variables in the auxiliary regression account for the possibility that the error variance depends on the values of the original regressors in some way (linear or quadratic). If the error term in the original model is in fact homoskedastic (has a constant variance) then the coefficients in the auxiliary regression (besides the constant) should be statistically indistinguishable from zero and the R^{2} should be "small". Conversely, a "large" R^{2} (scaled by the sample size so that it follows the chi-squared distribution) counts against the hypothesis of homoskedasticity.

An alternative to the White test is the Breusch–Pagan test, where the Breusch-Pagan test is designed to detect only linear forms of heteroskedasticity. Under certain conditions and a modification of one of the tests, they can be found to be algebraically equivalent.

If homoskedasticity is rejected one can use heteroskedasticity-consistent standard errors.

== Software implementations ==
- In R, White's Test can be implemented using the white function of the skedastic package.
- In Python, White's Test can be implemented using the het_white function of the statsmodels.stats.diagnostic.het_white
- In Stata, the test can be implemented using the estat imtest, white function.

== See also ==
- Heteroskedasticity
- Breusch–Pagan test
- Glejser test
- Goldfeld–Quandt test
- Park test
