= Henry Felix Kaiser =

American psychologist and educator

Henry Felix Kaiser (June 7, 1927 – January 14, 1992) was an American psychologist and educator who worked in the fields of psychometrics and statistical psychology. He developed the Varimax rotation method and the Kaiser–Meyer–Olkin test for factor analysis in the late 1950s.

== Life and work ==
He was born in Morristown, New Jersey. Kaiser studied psychology at the University of California, with a break in military service, where in 1956 he graduated with a Ph.D. in Psychological and Educational Statistics. In 1957 he was appointed assistant professor at the University of Illinois, where he became a professor in 1962. In 1965 he went to the University of Wisconsin as a professor of educational psychology. In 1968, he received an invitation to the University of California, Berkeley, which he accepted and where he retired in 1984.

Kaiser provided fundamental contributions to psychometrics and statistical psychology. His contributions to factor analysis were central. Kaiser was president of the Psychometric Society and the Society of Multivariate Experimental Psychology and publisher of the journal Multivariate Behavioral Research.

Kaiser was married and had two sons and a daughter. He died in Berkeley, California.

== Selected publications ==
- Henry Kaiser: The varimax criterion for analytic rotation in factor analysis, Psychometrika, Springer, New York, Vol. 23(3), September 1958
