= Portmanteau test =

Type of statistical test

A portmanteau test is a type of statistical hypothesis test in which the null hypothesis is well specified, but the alternative hypothesis is more loosely specified. Tests constructed in this context can have the property of being at least moderately powerful against a wide range of departures from the null hypothesis. Thus, in applied statistics, a portmanteau test provides a reasonable way of proceeding as a general check of a model's match to a dataset where there are many different ways in which the model may depart from the underlying data generating process. The use of such tests avoids having to be very specific about the particular type of departure being tested.

== Examples ==
In time series analysis, two well-known versions of a portmanteau test are available for testing for autocorrelation in the residuals of a model: it tests whether any of a group of autocorrelations of the residual time series are different from zero. This test is the Ljung–Box test, which is an improved version of the Box–Pierce test, having been devised at essentially the same time; a seemingly trivial simplification (omitted in the improved test) was found to have a deleterious effect. This portmanteau test is useful in working with ARIMA models.

In the context of regression analysis, including regression analysis with time series structures, a portmanteau test has been devised, which allows a general test to be made for the possibility that a range of types nonlinear transformations of combinations of the explanatory variables should have been included in addition to a selected model structure.
