= Levene's test =

Statistical test of equal group variances

In statistics, Levene's test is an inferential statistic used to assess the equality of variances for a variable calculated for two or more groups. This test is used because some common statistical procedures assume that variances of the populations from which different samples are drawn are equal. Levene's test assesses this assumption. It tests the null hypothesis that the population variances are equal (called homogeneity of variance or homoscedasticity). If the resulting p-value of Levene's test is less than some significance level (typically 0.05), the obtained differences in sample variances are unlikely to have occurred based on random sampling from a population with equal variances. Thus, the null hypothesis of equal variances is rejected and it is concluded that there is a difference between the variances in the population.

Levene's test has been used in the past before a comparison of means to inform the decision on whether to use a pooled t-test or the Welch's t-test for two sample tests or analysis of variance or Welch's modified oneway ANOVA for multi-level tests. However, it was shown that such a two-step procedure may markedly inflate the type 1 error obtained with the t-tests and thus is not recommended. Instead, the preferred approach is to just use Welch's test in all cases.

Levene's test may also be used as a main test for answering a stand-alone question of whether two sub-samples in a given population have equal or different variances.

Levene's test was developed by and named after American statistician and geneticist Howard Levene.

== Definition ==
Levene's test is equivalent to a 1-way between-groups analysis of variance (ANOVA) with the dependent variable being the absolute value of the difference between a score and the mean of the group to which the score belongs (shown below as $Z_{ij} = |Y_{ij} - \bar{Y}_{i\cdot}|$ ). The test statistic, $W$, is equivalent to the $F$ statistic that would be produced by such an ANOVA, and is defined as follows:

$$W = \frac{(N-k)}{(k-1)} \cdot \frac{\sum_{i=1}^k N_i (Z_{i\cdot}-Z_{\cdot\cdot})^2} {\sum_{i=1}^k \sum_{j=1}^{N_i} (Z_{ij}-Z_{i\cdot})^2},$$

where

- $k$ is the number of different groups to which the sampled cases belong,
- $N_i$ is the number of cases in the $i$th group,
- $N$ is the total number of cases in all groups,
- $Y_{ij}$ is the value of the measured variable for the$j$th case from the $i$th group,
- $$Z_{ij} = \begin{cases}
|Y_{ij} - \bar{Y}_{i\cdot}|, & \bar{Y}_{i\cdot} \text{ is a mean of the } i\text{-th group}, \\
|Y_{ij} - \tilde{Y}_{i\cdot}|, & \tilde{Y}_{i\cdot} \text{ is a median of the } i\text{-th group}. \end{cases}$$

(Both definitions are in use though the second one is, strictly speaking, the Brown–Forsythe test – see below for comparison.)

- $Z_{i\cdot} = \frac{1}{N_i} \sum_{j=1}^{N_i} Z_{ij}$ is the mean of the $Z_{ij}$ for group $i$,
- $Z_{\cdot\cdot} = \frac{1}{N} \sum_{i=1}^k \sum_{j=1}^{N_i} Z_{ij}$ is the mean of all $Z_{ij}$.

The test statistic $W$ is approximately F-distributed with $k-1$ and $N-k$ degrees of freedom, and hence is the significance of the outcome $w$ of $W$ tested against $F(1-\alpha;k-1,N-k)$ where $F$ is a quantile of the F-distribution, with $k-1$ and $N-k$ degrees of freedom, and $\alpha$ is the chosen level of significance (usually 0.05 or 0.01).

== Comparison with the Brown–Forsythe test ==
The Brown–Forsythe test uses the median instead of the mean in computing the spread within each group ($\bar{Y}$ vs. $\tilde{Y}$, above). Although the optimal choice depends on the underlying distribution, the definition based on the median is recommended as the choice that provides good robustness against many types of non-normal data while retaining good statistical power. If one has knowledge of the underlying distribution of the data, this may indicate using one of the other choices. Brown and Forsythe performed Monte Carlo studies that indicated that using the trimmed mean performed best when the underlying data followed a Cauchy distribution (a heavy-tailed distribution) and the median performed best when the underlying data followed a chi-squared distribution with four degrees of freedom (a heavily skewed distribution). Using the mean provided the best power for symmetric, moderate-tailed, distributions.

== Subgroup inconsistency and the dilution effect ==
Like the analysis of variance (ANOVA) framework upon which it is built, Levene's test is susceptible to a "dilution effect" or subgroup inconsistency when applied to three or more groups. Specifically, the omnibus test can fail to reject the global null hypothesis of homoscedasticity across $k \ge 3$ populations while a localized pairwise comparison simultaneously rejects the equality of variances for a specific pair of groups. This counterintuitive paradox occurs because the introduction of additional well-behaved groups increases the degrees of freedom and stabilizes the pooled within-group variance, thereby masking severe localized variance discrepancies.

== Software implementations ==
Many spreadsheet programs and statistics packages, such as R, Python, Stata, Julia, and MATLAB include implementations of Levene's test.

Language/Program	Function	Notes
Python	scipy.stats.levene(group1, group2, group3)	See
MATLAB	vartestn(data,groups,'TestType','LeveneAbsolute')	See
R	leveneTest(lm(y ~ x, data=data))	See
Julia	HypothesisTests.LeveneTest(group1, group2, group3)	See
Stata	robvar varname, by(groupvar)	Output includes both the Levene's and Brown and Forsythe statistics. See

== See also ==
- Bartlett's test
- F-test of equality of variances
- Box's M test
