= American Association of Wine Economists =

Non-profitable, educational organization

- Formation: 2006
- Founder: Karl Storchman; Orley Ashenfelter; Kym Anderson; Robert Stavins; Victor Ginsburgh
- Headquarters: New York City
- Website: https://wine-economics.org/

The American Association of Wine Economists (AAWE) is a non-profit, educational organization based in New York City.

The organization was founded by Karl Storchman, alongside Orley Ashenfelter, Kym Anderson, Robert Stavins, and Victor Ginsburgh in 2006.

They started a peer-reviewed scholarly journal, Journal of Wine Economics, that same year and in 2011 it was picked up by Cambridge University Press and started publishing four times a year, but has now moved to three times per year.
