= Ramsey RESET test =

Statistical test for model misspecification

In statistics, the Ramsey Regression Equation Specification Error Test (RESET) test is a general specification test for the linear regression model. More specifically, it tests whether non-linear combinations of the explanatory variables help to explain the response variable. The intuition behind the test is that if non-linear combinations of the explanatory variables have any power in explaining the response variable, the model is misspecified in the sense that the data generating process might be better approximated by a polynomial or another non-linear functional form.

The test was developed by James B. Ramsey as part of his Ph.D. thesis at the University of Wisconsin–Madison in 1968, and later published in the Journal of the Royal Statistical Society in 1969.

== Technical summary ==
Consider the model

$$\hat{y}=E\{y\mid x\}=\beta x.$$

The Ramsey test then tests whether $(\beta x)^2, (\beta x)^3, \ldots ,(\beta x)^k$ has any power in explaining y. This is executed by estimating the following linear regression

$$y=\beta x + \gamma_1\hat{y}^2+ \cdots +\gamma_{k-1}\hat{y}^k+\varepsilon,$$

and then testing, by a means of an F-test whether $\gamma_1~$ through $~\gamma_{k-1}$ are zero. If the null-hypothesis that all $\gamma~$ coefficients are zero is rejected, then the model suffers from misspecification.

== See also ==
- Harvey–Collier test
