= Bartlett's test =

Statistical test used to test homoscedasticity

In statistics, Bartlett's test, named after Maurice Stevenson Bartlett, is used to test homoscedasticity (or "homogeneity of variance"), that is, if multiple samples are from populations with equal variances. Some statistical tests, such as the analysis of variance, assume that variances are equal across groups or samples, which can be checked with Bartlett's test.

In a Bartlett test, we construct the null and alternative hypothesis. For this purpose several test procedures have been devised. The test procedure due to M.S.E (Mean Square Error/Estimator) Bartlett test is represented here. This test procedure is based on the statistic whose sampling distribution is approximately a Chi-Square distribution with (k − 1) degrees of freedom, where k is the number of random samples, which may vary in size and are each drawn from independent normal distributions.

Bartlett's test is unbiased in the Neyman–Pearson sense and consistent, but sensitive to departures from normality. That is, if the samples come from non-normal distributions, then Bartlett's test may simply be testing for non-normality. Levene's test and the Brown–Forsythe test are alternatives to the Bartlett test that are less sensitive to departures from normality.

Some statistical methods, assume that variances are equal across groups or samples. The Bartlett test can be used to verify that assumption. For example, in ANOVA, one can first verify that different populations have the same variance using Bartlett's test, then check that they have the same mean. However, George Box argued that using Bartlett's test to check whether it is appropriate to apply ANOVA would be like "putting a rowing boat to sea to find out whether conditions are sufficiently calm for an ocean liner to leave a port", because when different populations are of roughly equal sample size, the F-test is robust to both non-normality and different variances.

== Specification ==
Bartlett's test is used to test the null hypothesis, H_{0} that all k population variances are equal against the alternative that at least two are different.

For each of $i\in 1:k$, take $n_i$ samples from that population. Let its sample variances be $S_i^2$. Bartlett's test statistic is

$$\chi^2 = \frac{(N-k)\ln(S_p^2) - \sum_{i=1}^k(n_i - 1)\ln(S_i^2)}{1 + \frac{1}{3(k-1)}\left(\sum_{i=1}^k(\frac{1}{n_i-1}) - \frac{1}{N-k}\right)}$$

where $N = \sum_{i=1}^k n_i$ and $S_p^2 = \frac{1}{N-k} \sum_i (n_i-1)S_i^2$ is the pooled estimate for the variance.

The test statistic has approximately a $\chi^2_{k-1}$ distribution. Thus, the null hypothesis is rejected if $\chi^2 > \chi^2_{k-1,\alpha}$ (where $\chi^2_{k-1,\alpha}$ is the upper tail critical value for the $\chi^2_{k-1}$ distribution).

Bartlett's test is a modification of the corresponding likelihood ratio test designed to make the approximation to the $\chi^2_{k-1}$ distribution better (Bartlett 1937).

== Notes ==
The test statistics may be written in some sources with logarithms of base 10 as:

$$\chi^2 = 2.3026 \frac{(N-k)\log_{10}(S_p^2) - \sum_{i=1}^k(n_i - 1)\log_{10}(S_i^2)}{1 + \frac{1}{3(k-1)}\left(\sum_{i=1}^k(\frac{1}{n_i-1}) - \frac{1}{N-k}\right)}$$

== See also ==
- Box's M test
- Levene's test
- Kaiser–Meyer–Olkin test
