= ProStat =

- Developer(s): Poly Software International, Inc.
- Stable release: 5.5 / 2010
- Operating system: Windows
- Type: technical graphing and analysis package
- License: proprietary
- Website: Poly Software International, Inc.

ProStat is a program for statistical analysis and graphical presentation designed to analyze data and create publication quality 2D and 3D graphs developed by Poly Software International, Inc. The software can read multiple formats and perform mathematical transforms and statistical analyses. ProStat can help reach research and development goals, including analyzing data for a proposal, preparing graphs for publication, or solving technical research problems. ProStat is maintained on Microsoft Windows operating systems, and the current version is 5.5 for Windows 98 to Windows 7.

== History ==
ProStat was developed by Poly Software International, Inc. in 1996.

== Capabilities ==
ProStat provides a data sheet window called Sheet Window where data can be edited and analyzed, a graphics editing window called Plot Window where data can be plotted on screen, the capability to export to most computer graphic formats, and the ability to print at high resolutions on common dot-matrix printers, laser printers, plotters, or slide makers. Users can import their data from various formats including Microsoft Excel, ASCII, CSV, Microsoft Access, and dBase.

ProStat also includes a thirteen-lesson tutorial for new users to introduce them to the basics of ProStat.

== Comparison with PSI-Plot ==
PSI-Plot is the sister software to ProStat. The differences between the two software are generally in extent or depth of a tool class rather than presence or absence. ANOVA in PSI-Plot becomes ANOVA, ANCOVA and MANOVA in ProStat, while the range of plot types in ProStat is extended in PSI-Plot by the addition of options such as Pareto charts, Smith curves, ternary, vector, and column plots. FFT is available in both, but extended differently according to the emphases of the different target users.
