= PSI-Plot =

Data analysis and technical plotting software

- Developer(s): Poly Software International, Inc.
- Stable release: 9.5 / 2010
- Operating system: Windows
- Type: technical graphing and analysis package
- License: proprietary
- Website: Poly Software International, Inc.

PSI-Plot is a scientific and engineering data analysis and technical plotting software developed by Poly Software International, Inc. The software can read multiple formats and perform mathematical transforms and statistical analyses. PSI-Plot is maintained on Microsoft Windows operating systems, and the current version is 9.5 for Windows 98 to Windows 7.

== History ==
PSI-Plot was developed by Poly Software International, Inc. in September 1992, under the name TechPlot for MS-DOS. The name was later changed to PS-Plot, and changed again to the current PSI-Plot. PSI-Plot later migrated from MS-DOS to the Microsoft Windows operating system. Currently, PSI-Plot is used by more than 75,000 scientists and engineers worldwide.

== Capabilities ==
PSI-Plot features an Excel-style spreadsheet where users can manage and analyze their data, perform various numerical calculations, solve their equations, and visualize their data in 2D and 3D graphics. Users can also import their data from various formats including Microsoft Excel, ASCII, CSV, Microsoft Access, and dBase.

PSI-Plot also includes an eighteen-lesson tutorial for new users to introduce them to the basics of PSI-Plot.

=== Data Analysis ===
PSI-Plot has implemented a broad ranges of commonly used data analysis methods, which include data interpolation, three different methods (Levenberg-Marquardt, Powell, and Simplex) for non-linear curve fitting, over one hundred built-in fitting models, multiple linear fitting, stepwise multiple liner fitting, generalized linear models (GMLs), dose-response analysis, digital signal processing (DSP), matrix manipulation and eigen-problems, ordinary differential equations (ODE) solvers, algebraic equation solvers, difference equation solvers, and other methods.

=== 2D and 3D Plots ===
PSI-Plot provides various 2D and 3D plot types and allows users to customize the graphics in great detail for visual presentations and for submission to research journals for publication. Users have full control of plot and label attributes, including background color, color gradients, size, and thickness. PSI-Plot supports 2D and 3D Cartesian coordinate systems as well as special coordinate systems such as polar, Smith, ternary (triangle), Nichols, cylindrical, and spherical systems.

== Comparison with ProStat ==
ProStat is the sister software to PSI-Plot. The differences between the two software are generally in extent or depth of a tool class rather than presence or absence. ANOVA in PSI-Plot becomes ANOVA, ANCOVA and MANOVA in ProStat, while the range of plot types in ProStat is extended in PSI-Plot by the addition of options such as Pareto charts, Smith curves, ternary, vector, and column plots. FFT is available in both, but extended differently according to the emphases of the different target users.
