= General linear model =

Statistical linear model

The general linear model or general multivariate regression model is a compact way of simultaneously writing several multiple linear regression models. In that sense it is not a separate statistical linear model. The various multiple linear regression models may be compactly written as

$$\mathbf{Y} = \mathbf{X}\mathbf{B} + \mathbf{U},$$

where Y is a matrix with series of multivariate measurements (each column being a set of measurements on one of the dependent variables), X is a matrix of observations on independent variables that might be a design matrix (each column being a set of observations on one of the independent variables), B is a matrix containing parameters that are usually to be estimated and U is a matrix containing errors (noise). The errors are usually assumed to be uncorrelated across measurements, and follow a multivariate normal distribution. If the errors do not follow a multivariate normal distribution, generalized linear models may be used to relax assumptions about Y and U.

The general linear model (GLM) encompasses several statistical models, including ANOVA, ANCOVA, MANOVA, MANCOVA, and ordinary linear regression. Within this framework, both the t-test and the F-test can be applied. The general linear model is a generalization of multiple linear regression to the case of more than one dependent variable. If Y, B, and U were column vectors, the matrix equation above would represent multiple linear regression.

Hypothesis tests with the general linear model can be made in two ways: multivariate or as several independent univariate tests. In multivariate tests the columns of Y are tested together, whereas in univariate tests the columns of Y are tested independently, i.e., as multiple univariate tests with the same design matrix.

== Comparison to multiple linear regression ==
Multiple linear regression is a generalization of simple linear regression to the case of more than one independent variable, and a special case of general linear models, restricted to one dependent variable. The basic model for multiple linear regression is

$Y_i = \beta_0 + \beta_1 X_{i1} + \beta_2 X_{i2} + \ldots + \beta_p X_{ip} + \epsilon_i$ or more compactly $Y_i = \beta_0 + \sum \limits_{k=1}^{p} {\beta_k X_{ik}} + \epsilon_i$

for each observation i = 1, ... , n.

In the formula above we consider n observations of one dependent variable and p independent variables. Thus, Y_{i} is the i^{th} observation of the dependent variable, X_{ik} is i^{th} observation of the k^{th} independent variable, k = 1, 2, ..., p. The values βk represent parameters to be estimated, and ε_{i} is the i^{th} independent identically distributed normal error.

In the more general multivariate linear regression, there is one equation of the above form for each of m > 1 dependent variables that share the same set of explanatory variables and hence are estimated simultaneously with each other:

$Y_{ij} = \beta_{0j} + \beta_{1j} X_{i1} + \beta_{2j}X_{i2} + \ldots + \beta_{pj} X_{ip} + \epsilon_{ij}$ or more compactly $Y_{ij} = \beta_{0j} + \sum \limits_{k=1}^{p} { \beta_{kj} X_{ik}} + \epsilon_{ij}$

for all observations indexed as i = 1, ... , n and for all dependent variables indexed as j = 1, ... , m.

Note that, since each dependent variable has its own set of regression parameters to be fitted, from a computational point of view the general multivariate regression is simply a sequence of standard multiple linear regressions using the same explanatory variables.

== Comparison to generalized linear model ==
The general linear model and the generalized linear model (GLM) are two commonly used families of statistical methods to relate some number of continuous and/or categorical predictors to a single outcome variable.

The main difference between the two approaches is that the general linear model strictly assumes that the residuals will follow a conditionally normal distribution, while the GLM loosens this assumption and allows for a variety of other distributions from the exponential family for the residuals. The general linear model is a special case of the GLM in which the distribution of the residuals follow a conditionally normal distribution.

The distribution of the residuals largely depends on the type and distribution of the outcome variable; different types of outcome variables lead to the variety of models within the GLM family. Commonly used models in the GLM family include binary logistic regression for binary or dichotomous outcomes, Poisson regression for count outcomes, and linear regression for continuous, normally distributed outcomes. This means that GLM may be spoken of as a general family of statistical models or as specific models for specific outcome types.

| | General linear model | Generalized linear model |
|---|---|---|
| Typical estimation method | Least squares, best linear unbiased prediction | Maximum likelihood or Bayesian |
| Examples | ANOVA, ANCOVA, linear regression | linear regression, logistic regression, Poisson regression, gamma regression, general linear model |
| Extensions and related methods | MANOVA, MANCOVA, linear mixed model | generalized linear mixed model (GLMM), generalized estimating equations (GEE) |
| R package and function | lm() in stats package (base R) | glm() in stats package (base R) manova, |
| MATLAB function | mvregress() | glmfit() |
| SAS procedures | PROC GLM, PROC REG | PROC GENMOD, PROC LOGISTIC (for binary & ordered or unordered categorical outcomes) |
| Stata command | regress | glm |
| SPSS command | regression, glm | genlin, logistic |
| Wolfram Language & Mathematica function | LinearModelFit[] | GeneralizedLinearModelFit[] |
| EViews command | ls | glm |
| statsmodels Python Package | regression-and-linear-models | GLM |

== Applications ==
An application of the general linear model appears in the analysis of multiple brain scans in scientific experiments where Y contains data from brain scanners, X contains experimental design variables and confounds. It is usually tested in a univariate way (usually referred to a mass-univariate in this setting) and is often referred to as statistical parametric mapping.

== See also ==
- Bayesian multivariate linear regression
- F-test
- t-test
