= Grand mean =

Average of the means of several subsamples of same size

In statistics, the grand mean, pooled mean, or grand average is the overall average of the values in a set of numbers, regardless of how they may be grouped. The adjective grand or pooled is used for emphasis, to distinguish it from any of the group means, the averages computed within a particular subset of values.

In certain statistical models such as those used in analysis of variance, the term grand, overall, or general mean can also refer to a parameter, usually denoted $\mu$, describing an effect common to all observations. It may be thought of as an overall "average" in the sense of an expected value under the appropriate assumptions. This meaning of "grand mean" will not be treated here.

== Example ==
Suppose there are three groups of numbers: Group A has 2, 3, 7; group B has 6, 7, 12, 4; group C has 1, 3.

The grand mean of all numbers = (2+3+7+6+7+12+4+1+3)/9 = 5.

The group means are (2 + 3 + 7)/3 = 4 for group A, (6 + 7 + 12 + 4)/4 = 7.25 for group B, and (1 + 3)/2 = 2 for group C. Note that the average of the group means does not equal the grand mean, as is discussed below.

== Application ==
Suppose one wishes to determine which states in America have the tallest men. To do so, one measures the heights of a suitably sized sample of men in each state and the grand mean of heights across all the men sampled. A comparison of the state means with the national mean gives an indication of states where the average height is unusually high or low. (Determining with statistical significance whether the states actually differ, and whether a particular state has unusually tall or short men, requires the analysis of variance. The calculation there depends on the separate group variances and the pooled variance of the data.)

== Notation ==
In order to represent averages algebraically, the elements of a grouped data set are often denoted by $x_{ij}$, where i indicates the group and j the data point within the group. The mean of group i is similarly denoted by $\bar{x}_{i\cdot}$, while $\bar{x}_{\cdot \cdot}$ denotes the grand mean. (Note: The dots in the subscripts indicate the index(es) over which summation is applied.) The grand mean is then given by a double sum:

  
    
      
        
          
            
              
                x
                ¯
              
            
          
          
            ⋅
            ⋅
          
        
        =
        
          
            1
            N
          
        
        
          ∑
          
            i
            =
            1
          
          
            g
          
        
        
          ∑
          
            j
            =
            1
          
          
            
              n
              
                i
              
            
          
        
        
          x
          
            i
            j
          
        
        ,
      
    
    {\displaystyle {\bar {x}}_{\cdot \cdot }={\frac {1}{N}}\sum _{i=1}^{g}\sum _{j=1}^{n_{i}}x_{ij},}
  

where g is the number of groups, n_{i} is the number of observations (numbers) in group i, and N is the total number of observations, namely

$N = n_1 + n_2 + \cdots + n_g.$

Similarly, the mean of group i is given by

  
    
      
        
          
            
              
                x
                ¯
              
            
          
          
            i
            ⋅
          
        
        =
        
          
            1
            
              n
              
                i
              
            
          
        
        
          ∑
          
            j
            =
            1
          
          
            
              n
              
                i
              
            
          
        
        
          x
          
            i
            j
          
        
        .
      
    
    {\displaystyle {\bar {x}}_{i\cdot }={\frac {1}{n_{i}}}\sum _{j=1}^{n_{i}}x_{ij}.}
  

Written out, this sum is $\bar{x}_{i\cdot} = \frac{1}{n_i} (x_{i1}+ x_{i2} + \cdots + x_{in_i}).$

== Discussion ==
The grand mean can be computed from the group means by

  
    
      
        
          
            
              
                x
                ¯
              
            
          
          
            ⋅
            ⋅
          
        
        =
        
          
            1
            N
          
        
        
          ∑
          
            i
            =
            1
          
          
            g
          
        
        
          n
          
            i
          
        
        
          
            
              
                x
                ¯
              
            
          
          
            i
            ⋅
          
        
      
    
    {\displaystyle {\bar {x}}_{\cdot \cdot }={\frac {1}{N}}\sum _{i=1}^{g}n_{i}{\bar {x}}_{i\cdot }}
  
.

This may be viewed as a weighted average of the group means, where the weight assigned to the i th mean is $n_i/N$. In general, the grand mean is not a simple average of the individual group means. For instance, in the opening example above, the (unweighted) average of the three group means is (4 + 7.25 + 2)/3 = 4.4166..., while the grand mean is 5.

However, there is one case where the grand mean can be computed as the simple average of the group means, namely when the groups all have the same size, that is, when $n_1 = n_2 = \cdots = n_g.$ This follows easily from the above formula.

Example Suppose the data consists of three equal-size groups: Group A has 2, 6, 7, 11, 4; group B has 4, 6, 8, 14, 8; group C has 8, 7, 4, 1, 5.

The mean of group A = (2+6+7+11+4)/5 = 6,

The mean of group B = (4+6+8+14+8)/5 = 8,

The mean of group C = (8+7+4+1+5)/5 = 5,

Therefore, the grand mean of all the numbers = (6+8+5)/3 = 6.333..., as could be computed by averaging all 15 values pooled together.

To avoid possible confusion, the term "grand mean" is never used for the average of the individual group means.

== See also ==
- Pooled variance
