= Analysis of rhythmic variance =

Statistical method for detecting rhythms in biological time series

In statistics, analysis of rhythmic variance (ANORVA) is a method for detecting rhythms in biological time series, published by Peter Celec (Biol Res. 2004, 37(4 Suppl A):777–82). It is a procedure for detecting cyclic variations in biological time series and quantification of their probability. ANORVA is based on the premise that the variance in groups of data from rhythmic variables is low when a time distance of one period exists between the data entries.
