= Welch–Satterthwaite equation =

Equation to approximate pooled degrees of freedom

In statistics and uncertainty analysis, the Welch–Satterthwaite equation is used to calculate an approximation to the effective degrees of freedom of a linear combination of independent sample variances, also known as the pooled degrees of freedom, corresponding to the pooled variance.

For n sample variances s_{i}^{2} (i = 1, ..., n), each respectively having ν_{i} degrees of freedom, often one computes the linear combination.

$$\chi' = \sum_{i=1}^n k_i s_i^2.$$

where $k_i$ are weights. These are real positive numbers, in some domains $k_i=\frac{1}{\nu_i+1}$ may be used. In general, the probability distribution of χ' cannot be expressed analytically. However, its distribution can be approximated by another chi-squared distribution, whose effective degrees of freedom are given by the Welch–Satterthwaite equation

$$\nu_{\chi'} \approx \frac{\displaystyle\left(\sum_{i=1}^n k_i s_i^2\right)^2}
{\displaystyle\sum_{i=1}^n \frac{(k_i s_i^2)^2}
{\nu_i}
}$$

There is no assumption that the underlying population variances σ_{i}^{2} are equal. This is known as the Behrens–Fisher problem.

The result can be used to perform approximate statistical inference tests. The simplest application of this equation is in performing Welch's t-test.

The original Welch–Satterthwaite equation is known to systematically underestimate the effective degrees of freedom when the component degrees of freedom ν_{i} are not large. This bias arises because the derivation implicitly uses the large-sample approximation $\nu_i/(\nu_i+2) \approx 1$ when representing the expected value of s_{i}^{4}. A bias-corrected estimator that accounts for the finite degrees of freedom of each component is given by

$$\nu_{\chi'}^{\text{(corr)}} \approx \frac{\displaystyle\left(\sum_{i=1}^n k_i s_i^2\right)^2}
{\displaystyle\sum_{i=1}^n \frac{(k_i s_i^2)^2}
{\nu_i + 2}
} \;-\; 2.$$

As ν_{i} → ∞ for all components, the extra terms vanish and the corrected formula reduces to the original Welch–Satterthwaite equation. Simulation studies confirm that the corrected estimator closely matches the nominal degrees of freedom even for small component sizes, whereas the original equation exhibits severe downward bias.
