= Five Facet Mindfulness Questionnaire =

Psychological questionnaire

The Five Facet Mindfulness Questionnaire (FFMQ) is a psychological measurement that explores mindfulness. The FFMQ was created by Ruth A. Baer and her colleagues. FFMQ is based on five independently developed mindfulness questionnaires that are bound together in a factor analytic study.

Since its publication, the FFMQ has become one of the most prevalent instruments for measuring dispositional mindfulness (a person's general tendency to be mindful), with applications in both research and clinical contexts. The FFMQ has been frequently employed to evaluate outcomes in mindfulness-centered interventions, such as Mindfulness-Based Stress Reduction. The scale has been translated into multiple languages and applied in computational modelling of mindfulness as a framework of interconnected psychological skills.

== Development and Structure ==
Baer and other researchers developed the FFMQ through an exploratory factor analysis (EFA) of 112 items pooled from five preceding mindfulness scales:

1. The Freiburg Mindfulness Inventory (FMI)
2. The Kentucky Inventory of Mindfulness Skills (KIMS)
3. The Cognitive and Affective Mindfulness Scale (CAMS)
4. The Mindful Attention Awareness Scale (MAAS)
5. The Mindfulness Questionnaire (MQ)

The analysis was conducted on the responses obtained from a sample of 613 undergraduate psychology students. The resulting factor structure comprised five distinct yet interconnected facets of mindfulness. The five facets are: observing, describing, acting with awareness, non-judging of inner experience, and non-reactivity to inner experience. The final structure resembled the four-factor model of the KIMS, however expanded to include a fifth component, nonreactivity. The questionnaire consists of 39 items, which are each evaluated on a five-point Likert-type scale, with 1 denoting "never or very rarely true" and 5 "very often or always true". Within the original study, each subscale exhibited strong internal consistency, with Cronbach's alpha coefficients (α) ranging from .75 and .91. The article has been cited by over 6000 PubMed Central articles.

Following the EFA, a follow-up confirmatory factor analysis (CFA) was conducted to examine the scale's construct validity in both meditating and nonmeditating groups. The original structure was confirmed by the CFA, with internal consistency for each subscale remaining high. The authors also investigated whether the five facets could be viewed as elements of a higher-order mindfulness construct. This hierarchical model was ultimately confirmed in the meditating sample, indicating that the five facets can function both as separate constructs and indicators of a general mindfulness trait in some populations.

== The Five Facets of Mindfulness ==
The FFMQ operationalises mindfulness as five distinct, yet interrelated constructs, which are each measured through a dedicated subscale.

=== Observing (Observe) ===
This facet evaluates the ability of an individual to attend to both internal and external stimuli, such as sensations, emotions, and cognitions. An example item is: "I notice the smells and aromas of things." While displaying high internal consistency, its psychometric properties seemingly vary contingent on meditation experience. Baer and other researchers found that the facet was not significantly correlated with other mindfulness traits in non-meditating samples, whereas Observation aligned more strongly with such traits in meditators.

=== Describing (Describe) ===
This facet assesses an individual's capacity to describe and articulate inner experiences, such as bodily states or emotions, with words. One example item is: "I'm good at finding words to describe my feelings." In a Dutch study of the FFMQ executed on adults with depressive symptoms, the Describe facet displayed strong internal consistency (α = .91), highlighting robustness in clinical and translated contexts.

=== Acting with Awareness (Actaware) ===
This facet measures one's ability to allocate attention to activities in the present moment. An example item under this subscale is: "I find myself preoccupied with the future or the past." In a large CFA conducted on a sample that included both meditators and non-meditators, Acting with Awareness displayed high internal consistency (α = .90). The study also demonstrated a significant positive relationship between the subscale and life satisfaction, as well as emotional intelligence.

=== Non-judging of Inner Experience (Nonjudge) ===
The Non-judging facet assesses an individual's ability to perceive thoughts and emotions through a lens of acknowledgement, rather than suppression or criticality. A sample item is: "I disapprove of myself when I have irrational ideas." In addition to displaying strong internal consistency (α = .87), a large-scale cross-cultural network analysis found that Non-judging systematically demonstrated a positive association with emotional stability across samples.

=== Non-reactivity to Inner Experience (Nonreact) ===
This facet assesses the ability to allow the free flow of thoughts and emotions without becoming overly preoccupied with them. An example item is: "I watch my feelings without getting lost in them." Among the five facets, Non-reactivity frequently displays the lowest internal consistency (α = .75), though not dramatically so.

== Applications ==
The FFMQ is applicable in both research and clinical contexts alike. A meta-analysis of 148 studies, collectively amassing over 44,000 participants found that FFMQ scores were significantly negatively associated with affective symptoms, with the Acting with Awareness and Non-judging facets showing the strongest correlations. In applied healthcare, the FFMQ was employed to assess the efficacy of a mindfulness-based intervention for intensive care nurses caring for COVID-19 patients. The study found that the intervention yielded measurable and significant improvements in four out of the five FFMQ subscales. Recently, scholars have also started to rely upon the FFMQ to develop computational models of mindfulness wherein mindfulness is viewed as a set of interrelated skills constitutive of mindfulness. Hitchcock and colleagues applied a drift-diffusion model to investigate how self-judgement patterns associate with three FFMQ subscales. The study found that mindfulness facets impact how individuals process self-related information, highlighting the FFMQ's function as a trait-level predictor in computational models.

== Cross-Cultural Validation ==
The FFMQ has been translated into and validated for many languages, including Swedish and French. Cross-cultural applicability has been investigated; a large-scale study involving over 8,500 participants from 16 countries examined whether the FFMQ's structure remained consistent across cultural contexts. Karl and colleagues found that the five-factor structure did not comfortably replicate across national contexts, and that invariance was not supported. Better model fit was observed in individualistic populations than collectivist societies.

== Criticism ==
Some researchers have expressed concerns about the FFMQ's psychometric structure. One criticism of the FFMQ is that negative and positive question wording introduces variance unrelated to the constructs being measured, a so-called "method effect". A study conducted by Van Dam and other researchers found that the wording of items may influence response patterns independently of their actual content. The authors indicate that these method effects may account for differences in item ratings, rather than true identification with mindfulness concepts, a potential explanation for differences observed in meditating versus non-meditating samples.

Further concerns regarding the structural validity of the FFMQ have been raised. Goldberg and colleagues, in a large-scale CFA involving both non-meditators and meditators, found that the five facets did not coherently form a single higher-order mindfulness construct. The study suggested that the FFMQ may be more practically useful if facet scores are interpreted separately, rather than considering the composite mindfulness score.

== See also ==
- Mindfulness
- Mindfulness-Based Stress Reduction
