= Consensus-based assessment =

Consensus-based assessment expands on the common practice of consensus decision-making and the theoretical observation that expertise can be closely approximated by large numbers of novices or journeymen. It creates a method for determining measurement standards for very ambiguous domains of knowledge, such as emotional intelligence, politics, religion, values and culture in general. From this perspective, the shared knowledge that forms cultural consensus can be assessed in much the same way as expertise or general intelligence.

== Measurement standards for general intelligence ==
Consensus-based assessment is based on a simple finding: that samples of individuals with differing competence (e.g., experts and apprentices) rate relevant scenarios, using Likert scales, with similar mean ratings. Thus, from the perspective of a CBA framework, cultural standards for scoring keys can be derived from the population that is being assessed. Peter Legree and Joseph Psotka, working together over the past decades, proposed that psychometric g could be measured unobtrusively through survey-like scales requiring judgments. This could either use the deviation score for each person from the group or expert mean; or a Pearson correlation between their judgments and the group mean. The two techniques are perfectly correlated. Legree and Psotka subsequently created scales that requested individuals to estimate word frequency; judge binary probabilities of good continuation; identify knowledge implications; and approximate employment distributions. The items were carefully identified to avoid objective referents, and therefore the scales required respondents to provide judgments that were scored against broadly developed, consensual standards. Performance on this judgment battery correlated approximately 0.80 with conventional measures of psychometric g. The response keys were consensually derived. Unlike mathematics or physics questions, the selection of items, scenarios, and options to assess psychometric g were guided roughly by a theory that emphasized complex judgment, but the explicit keys were unknown until the assessments had been made: they were determined by the average of everyone's responses, using deviation scores, correlations, or factor scores.

== Measurement standards for cultural knowledge ==
One way to understand the connection between expertise and consensus is to consider that for many performance domains, expertise largely reflects knowledge derived from experience. Since novices tend to have fewer experiences, their opinions err in various inconsistent directions. However, as experience is acquired, the opinions of journeymen through to experts become more consistent. According to this view, errors are random. Ratings data collected from large samples of respondents of varying expertise can thus be used to approximate the average ratings a substantial number of experts would provide were many experts available. Because the standard deviation of a mean will approach zero as the number of observations becomes very large, estimates based on groups of varying competence will provide converging estimates of the best performance standards. The means of these groups’ responses can be used to create effective scoring rubrics, or measurement standards to evaluate performance. This approach is particularly relevant to scoring subjective areas of knowledge that are scaled using Likert response scales, and the approach has been applied to develop scoring standards for several domains where experts are scarce.

== Experimental results ==
In practice, analyses have demonstrated high levels of convergence between expert and CBA standards with values quantifying those standards highly correlated (Pearson Rs ranging from .72 to .95), and with scores based on those standards also highly correlated (Rs ranging from .88 to .99) provided the sample size of both groups is large (Legree, Psotka, Tremble & Bourne, 2005). This convergence between CBA and expert referenced scores and the associated validity data indicate that CBA and expert based scoring can be used interchangeably, provided that the ratings data are collected using large samples of experts and novices or journeymen.

== Factor analysis ==
CBA is often computed by using the Pearson R correlation of each person's Likert scale judgments across a set of items against the mean of all people's judgments on those same items. The correlation is then a measure of that person's proximity to the consensus. It is also sometimes computed as a standardized deviation score from the consensus means of the groups. These two procedures are mathematically isomorphic. If culture is considered to be shared knowledge; and the mean of the group's ratings on a focused domain of knowledge is considered a measure of the cultural consensus in that domain; then both procedures assess CBA as a measure of an individual person's cultural understanding.

However, it may be that the consensus is not evenly distributed over all subordinate items about a topic. Perhaps the knowledge content of the items is distributed over domains with differing consensus. For instance, conservatives who are libertarians may feel differently about invasion of privacy than conservatives who feel strongly about law and order. In fact, standard factor analysis brings this issue to the fore.

In either centroid or principal components analysis (PCA) the first factor scores are created by multiplying each rating by the correlation of the factor (usually the mean of all standardized ratings for each person) against each item's ratings. This multiplication weights each item by the correlation of the pattern of individual differences on each item (the component scores). If consensus is unevenly distributed over these items, some items may be more focused on the overall issues of the common factor. If an item correlates highly with the pattern of overall individual differences, then it is weighted more strongly in the overall factor scores. This weighting implicitly also weights the CBA score, since it is those items that share a common CBA pattern of consensus that are weighted more in factor analysis.

The transposed or Q methodology factor analysis, created by William Stephenson (psychologist) brings this relationship out explicitly. CBA scores are statistically isomorphic to the component scores in PCA for a Q factor analysis. They are the loading of each person's responses on the mean of all people's responses. So, Q factor analysis may provide a superior CBA measure, if it can be used first to select the people who represent the dominant dimension, over items that best represent a subordinate attribute dimension of a domain (such as liberalism in a political domain). Factor analysis can then provide the CBA of individuals along that particular axis of the domain.

In practice, when items are not easily created and arrayed to provide a highly reliable scale, the Q factor analysis is not necessary, since the original factor analysis should also select those items that have a common consensus. So, for instance, in a scale of items for political attitudes, the items may ask about attitudes toward big government; law and order; economic issues; labor issues; or libertarian issues. Which of these items most strongly bear on the political attitudes of the groups polled may be difficult to determine a priori. However, since factor analysis is a symmetric computation on the matrix of items and people, the original factor analysis of items, (when these are Likert scales) selects not just those items that are in a similar domain, but more generally, those items that have a similar consensus. The added advantage of this factor analytic technique is that items are automatically arranged along a factor so that the highest Likert ratings are also the highest CBA standard scores. Once selected, that factor determines the CBA (component) scores.

== Critiques ==
The most common critique of CBA standards is to question how an average could possibly be a maximal standard. This critique argues that CBA is unsuitable for maximum-performance tests of psychological attributes, especially intelligence. Even so, CBA techniques are routinely employed in various measures of non-traditional intelligences (e.g., practical, emotional, social, etc.). Detailed critiques are presented in Gottfredson (2003) and MacCann, Roberts, Matthews, & Zeidner (2004) as well as elsewhere in the scientific literature.

== See also ==
- Collective intelligence
- Consensus decision-making
- Consensus democracy
- Consensus theory of truth
- Emotional Intelligence
- Intelligence
- Participation (decision making)
- Polder model
- Social representations
- Unanimity
- Libertarian socialism
