= Scree plot =

Diagnostic plot in multivariate statistics

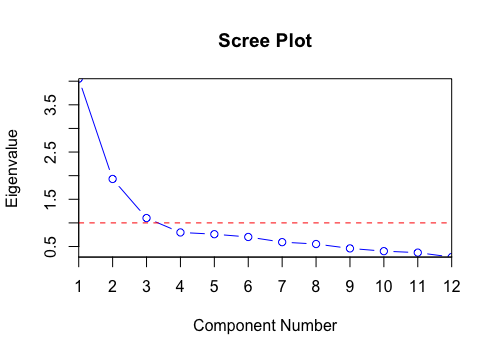
A sample scree plot produced in R. The Kaiser criterion is shown in red.

In multivariate statistics, a scree plot is a line plot of the eigenvalues of factors or principal components in an analysis. The scree plot is used to determine the number of factors to retain in an exploratory factor analysis (FA) or principal components to keep in a principal component analysis (PCA). The procedure of finding statistically significant factors or components using a scree plot is also known as a scree test. Raymond B. Cattell introduced the scree plot in 1966.

A scree plot always displays the eigenvalues in a downward curve, ordering the eigenvalues from largest to smallest. According to the scree test, the "elbow" of the graph where the eigenvalues seem to level off is found, and factors or components to the left of this point should be retained as significant.

As the "elbow" point has been defined as point of maximum curvature, this property has led to the creation of the Kneedle algorithm.

== Etymology ==
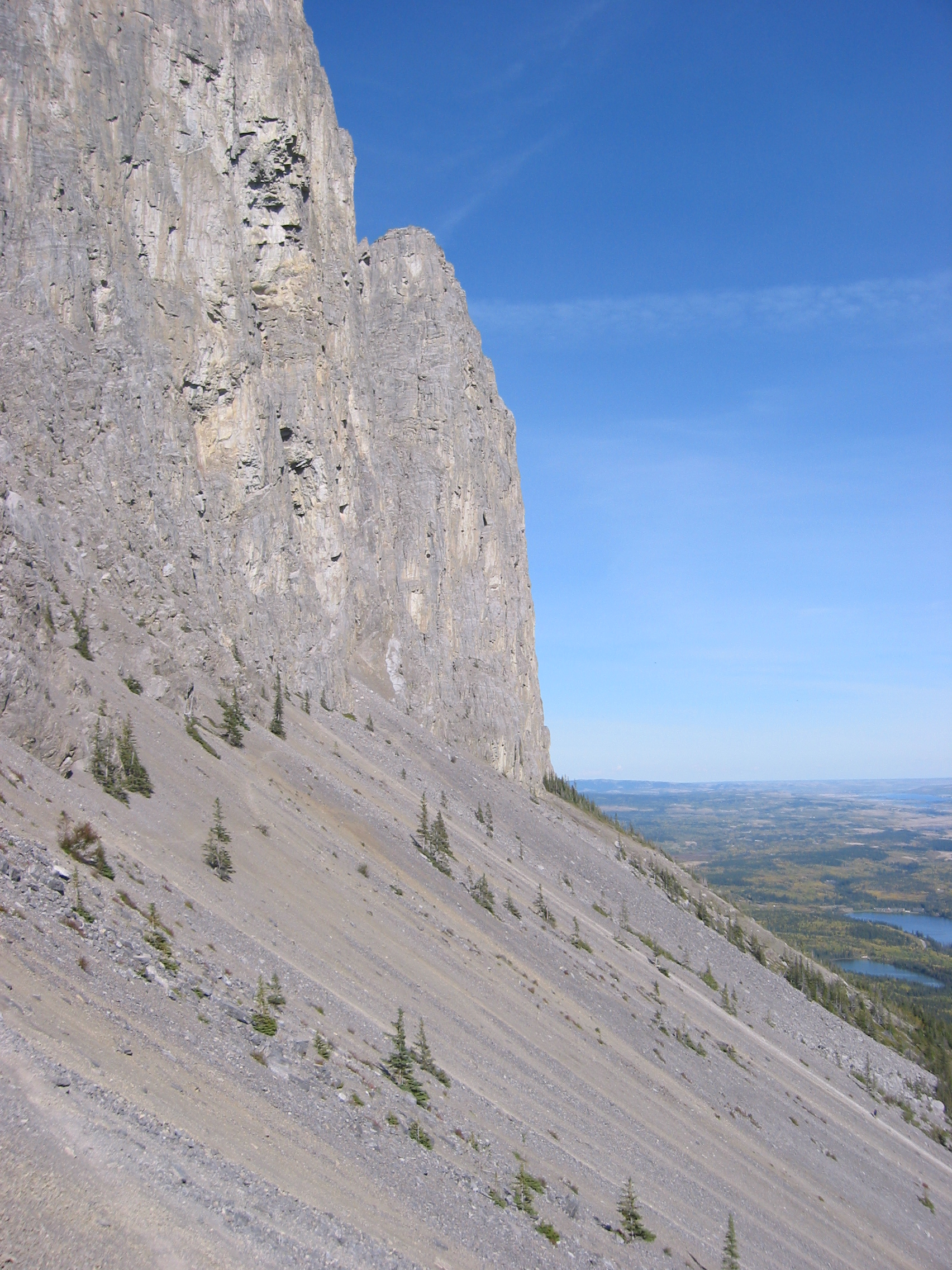
A scree at Mount Yamnuska, Alberta, Canada

The scree plot is named after the elbow's resemblance to a scree in nature.

== Criticism ==
This test is sometimes criticized for its subjectivity. Scree plots can have multiple "elbows" that make it difficult to know the correct number of factors or components to retain, making the test unreliable. There is also no standard for the scaling of the x and y axes, which means that different statistical programs can produce different plots from the same data.

The test has also been criticized for producing too few factors or components for factor retention.

== See also ==
- Biplot
- Parallel analysis
- Elbow method
- Determining the number of clusters in a data set
