= WCSS (disambiguation) =

WCSS is an American radio station.

WCSS may also refer to:

- Welland Centennial Secondary School, a public high school in Welland, Ontario, Canada
- West China School of Stomatology, a public dental hospital in Chengdu, SIchuan, China
- Westview Centennial Secondary School, a public high school in Toronto, Ontario, Canada
- Within-cluster sum of squares, a metric in cluster analysis (used for example in the elbow method)
- World Congress of Soil Science, a conference held by the International Union of Soil Sciences
- World Congress on Social Simulation, a scientific conference series held by the European Social Simulation Association
- Wrocławskie Centrum Sieciowo-Superkomputerowe (Wrocław Center for Networking and Supercomputing), a part of the Wrocław University of Science and Technology providing environmental IT services for the Lower Silesia region
