= The Vectors of Mind =

Book published by psychologist Louis Leon Thurstone

The Vectors of Mind; Multiple-Factor Analysis for the Isolation of Primary Traits
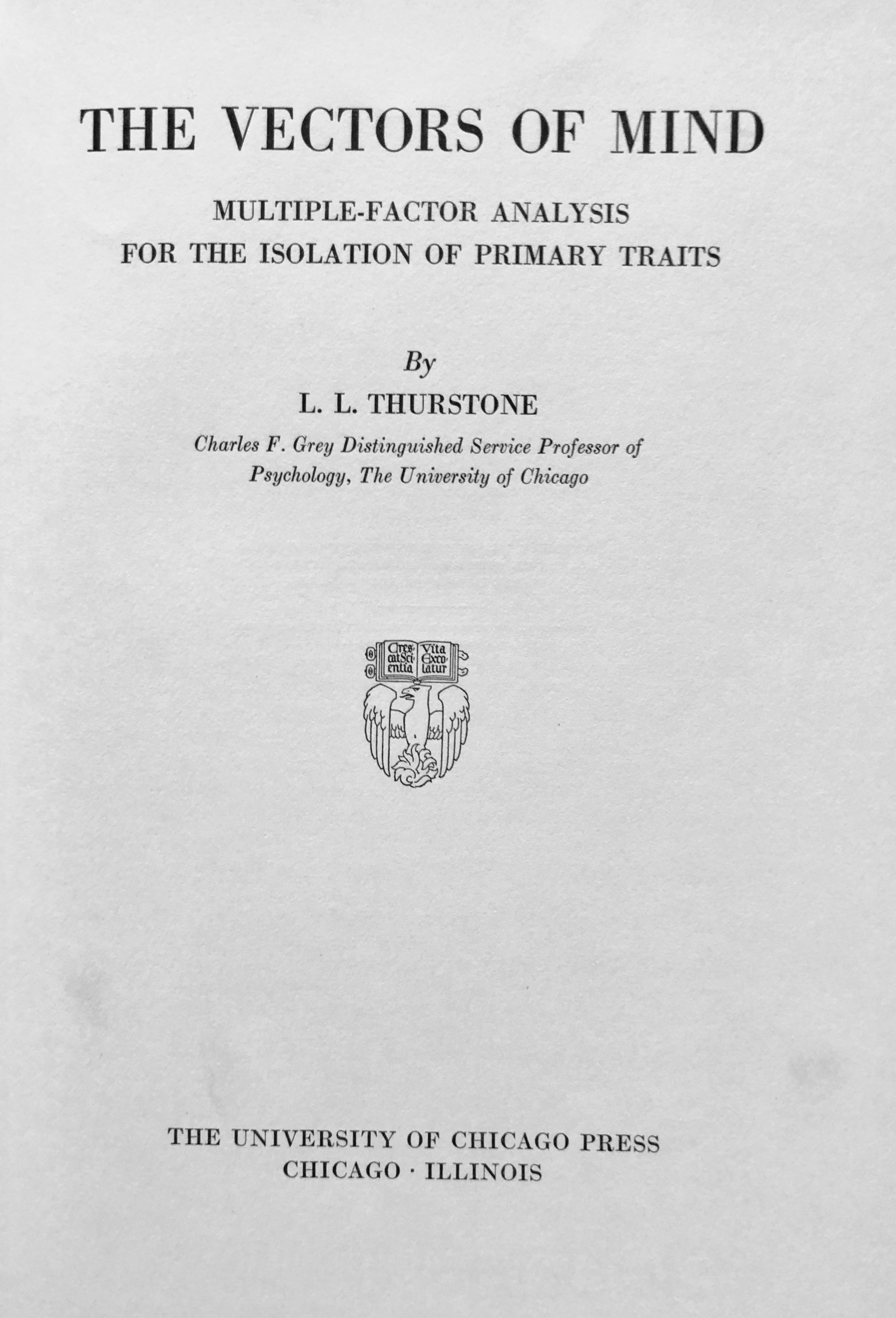
- Author: L. L. Thurstone
- Language: English
- Subjects: Factor analysis, psychometrics
- Publisher: University of Chicago Press
- Publication date: August 1935
- Publication place: United States
- Media type: Print
- Pages: 266

The Vectors of Mind is a book published by American psychologist Louis Leon Thurstone in 1935 that summarized Thurstone's methodology for multiple factor analysis.

== Overview ==
The Vectors of Mind presents Thurstone's methods for conducting a factor analysis on a set of variables that allow for more than one factor, an important extension of Spearman's unifactor method. Having multiple factors adds significant complications and much of the book is focused on the problem of rotation. It attempts to solve this problem by providing an objective basis for the rotation factors, called simple structure, and advocates for the use of oblique (correlated) factors to achieve a simple structure. The book utilizes his centroid method of factor extraction, which made it feasible to complete the arduous calculations necessary for a factor analysis at a time when fast electronic computers had not even been imagined. This is a predominantly technical book that relies heavily upon mathematical presentations and provides multiple numerical examples. However, the early chapters delve into philosophical questions of the nature of science and present Thurstone's understanding of measurement theory.

== Synopsis ==
Preface. This book extends and presents more formally the findings from the author's Multiple Factor Analysis paper of 1931. The author notes that he only recently learned matrix theory and presumes that other psychologists have had similar limitations in their training. He finds existing textbooks on the topic inadequate and the book begins with a presentation of matrix theory, written for those with undergraduate instruction in analytic geometry and real number calculus. The author expresses indebted to various professors in the mathematics department of the University of Chicago for helping him to develop his ideas. He also expresses appreciation to his computer (a person, Leone Chesire), who also wrote the appendix on the calculations used in the centroid method. He foresees a bright future for the use of factor analysis and expects to see the simplification of the computational methods. He expects factor analysis to become an important technique it the early stages of science. For example, the laws of classical mechanics could have been revealed by a factor analysis, by analyzing a great many attributes of objects that are dropped or thrown from an elevated point, with the time of fall factor uncorrelated with the weight factor. Work by Sewell Wright on path coefficients and Truman L. Kelley on multiple factors differs from factor analysis, which Thurstone sees as an extension of professor Spearman's work.

Mathematical Introduction. A brief presentation of matrices, determinants, matrix multiplication, diagonal matrices, the inverse, the characteristic equation, summation notation, linear dependence, geometric interpretations, orthogonal transformations, and oblique transformations.

Chapter I. The Factor Problem. Natural phenomena are only comprehensible through constructs that are man-made inventions. A scientific law is not part of nature; it is but man's way of understanding nature. Examples are provided of such man-made constructs from physics. He responds to skepticism from the practitioners of "rigorous science" that human behavior can ever be brought into the fold of such science by pointing out that there is considerable individuality in physical events even though described by rigorous scientific laws, such as the fact that every explosion is unique. Human abilities are the cause of individual differences in the "completion of a task". The science of psychology will reduce a large number of psychological abilities down to primary reference traits. Formal definitions are provided for the concepts of trait, ability, test, score, linear independence, statistical independence, experimental independence, reference abilities, primary abilities, and unitary ability. These conceptions constitute a theory of measurement that defines factors common to all tests in a battery (the communality of the test battery), a specific factor that is unique to one test (the specificity of the test), and the error variance. Factor analysis can determine the communality of a test, but cannot separate the uniqueness into the specific factor and the error factors. The reliability coefficient is the sum of communality and the specificity of a test.

Chapter II. The Fundamental Factor Theorem. The factor matrix post-multiplied by its transpose gives the reduced correlation matrix: this is the fundamental factor theorem. The task of factor analysis is to find a factor matrix of the lowest possible rank (the least number of factors) that can reproduce the off-diagonal members of the observed correlation matrix as close as can be expected, allowing for sample variation. The bulk of the chapter considers mathematical issues, including the rank of a matrix and methods for estimating the commonalities of the correlation matrix (the diagonal elements).

Chapter III: The Centroid Method. A computation method is developed for factoring a correlation matrix, which is a symmetric matrix of real elements. After a conceptual presentation of the method, some worked examples are provided, including one with eight variables, and another with fifteen variables that are factored into four factors. The mechanics of the calculations are given in Appendix I, which provides the specific steps in making the calculation (the algorithm).

Chapter IV: The Principal Axes. A method is presented for determining a desirable rotation of the orthogonal factors called the principal axes. The mathematical foundations are provided, as well as worked examples. This approach is distinguished from Hotelling's method, which the author feels has limited usefulness to factor analysis. The unrotated solution for 15 psychological tests given in chapter III are rotated to their principal axes.

Chapter V: The Special Case of Rank One. Spearman presented factor analysis with a single factor (a matrix with rank one) thirty years, but recent advances have made it possible to extend factor analysis to multiple factors. The shortcomings of Spearman's method of tetrad differences are detailed and the current approach found to be more accurate. A numerical example is given.

Chapter VI: Primary Traits. Rotation does not affect the results of the fundamental factor theorem. All rotations result in the same reduced correlation matrix so other criteria must be used to ascertain the best rotation. Criteria refer to "simple structure": the book presents very detailed criteria for simple structure, but more generally it consists of minimizing the number of loading for each variable and wide variance for loadings of each factor. Realizing simple structure may require uses of oblique (correlated) factors. Three additional criteria are given that define when the simple structure is unique. Graphical-mathematical methods are developed for understanding and defining the structure that reveals primary traits–the scientific goal of factor analysis. The prior worked example of fifteen psychological traits is rotated to an oblique simple structure to reveal three intercorrelated primary traits.

Chapters VII - X: The remaining chapters explore more specific details and problems that can arise. Chapter VII considers several methods for isolating primary traits, with numerical examples given. Chapter VIII addresses the methodological problems that can arise when the correlation matrix has negative correlations. Though most scientific investigations of primary abilities will entail oblique factors, there are situations where the factors are likely to be orthogonal. Chapter IX looks at techniques for achieving orthogonal rotations. The results of a factor analysis can be used to estimate each individual's score on the primary abilities based upon the individual's scores on the tests. Chapter X presents a method for obtaining the regression weights for estimating primary abilities from subject scores, and well as for estimating subjects scores from the primary traits (for estimating the components of variance of the subject scores).

Appendices. I: Outline of Calculations for the Centroid Method with Unknown Diagonals. II: A Method of Finding the Roots of a Polynomial. III: A Method of Determining the Square Root on the Calculating Machine.

== Historical context ==
In 1904 Charles Spearman published a paper that largely founded the field of psychometrics and included a crude form of factor analysis that attempted to determine if a single factor model was appropriate. There was limited subsequent work on factor analysis until Thurstone published a paper in 1931 called Multiple Factor Analysis, which expanded Spearman's single-factor analysis to include more than one factor. In 1932, Hotelling presented a more accurate method of extracting factors, which he called principal components analysis. Thurstone rejected Hotelling's approach because it set the commonalities to 1.0, and Thurstone realized that will introduce distortions to the factor loadings when variables include unique components. Hotelling's method was also limited by the fact that it required too much calculation to be usable with more than about ten variables. A year after Hotelling's paper, Thurstone presented a more efficient way of extracting factors, called the centroid method, which allowed the factor analysis of a far larger number of variables. Later that year he gave his presidential address to the American Psychological Association wherein he presented the results of several factor analyses, including a factor analysis of 60 adjectives describing personality traits, showing how they could be reduced to five personality traits. He also presented analyses of 37 mental health symptoms, of attitudes towards 12 controversial social issues, and of 9 IQ tests. In those analyses, Thurstone had made use of tetrachoric correlation coefficients, a method for estimating continuous variable correlations from dichotomous variables. Tetrachorics require extensive calculations but in early 1933, he and two colleagues at the University of Chicago published a set of computing diagrams that greatly reduce the calculations needed for those coefficients, another aspect of making his method of factor analysis practical with more than just a few variables. His 1933 presidential address was published in early 1934 with the title Vectors of the Mind. It lacked methodological and mathematical details of his technique, which is then the subject of this book. A 2004 conference called Factor Analysis at 100 produced a book with two chapters that document the historical importance Thurstone's contributions to factor analysis. Thurstone's approach to factor analysis remains an important method in psychological research and it has since been used in numerous other fields of study. It is now considered part of a family of methods for analyzing the covariance structure of variables, which includes principal component analysis, exploratory factor analysis, confirmatory factor analysis, and structural equation modeling.
