= Anton Formann =

Austrian research psychologist, statistician and psychometrician

Anton K. Formann
- Born: 27 August 1949; Vienna, Austria
- Died: 12 July 2010 (aged 60); Vienna, Austria
- Known for: Item response theory (Rasch models); Latent class analysis Mixture models Categorical data analysis Quantitative methods for research synthesis (meta-analysis)
- Scientific career
- Fields: Psychology; Psychometrics; Applied Statistics; Mathematical Psychology
- Workplaces: University of Vienna; Sheffield Hallam University, UK
- Doctoral advisor: Gerhard H. Fischer

Anton K. Formann (August 27, 1949, Vienna, Austria – July 12, 2010, Vienna) was an Austrian research psychologist, statistician, and psychometrician. He is renowned for his contributions to item response theory (Rasch models), latent class analysis, the measurement of change, mixture models, categorical data analysis, and quantitative methods for research synthesis (meta-analysis).

== Biography ==
Anton K. Formann studied psychology with statistics and anthropology (individual curriculum approved by the university) at the University of Vienna, Austria, where he received his PhD in psychology in 1973 under the supervision of Gerhard H. Fischer at the university's Department of Psychology. He worked as a post doc researcher and Assistant Professor at Fischer's division until 1985, when he earned his postdoctoral professorial qualification (habilitation in psychology) and became Associate Professor at the University of Vienna. He also studied statistics at Sheffield Hallam University (UK) where he graduated (MSc with distinction) in 1998. In 1999, he gained his second postdoctoral professional qualification (habilitation in applied statistics). In 2004, after being substitute chair holder for 5 years, he became full professor for psychological methods at the University of Vienna, succeeding the chair of mathematical psychology of Gerhard H. Fischer. From 2005 onwards, Formann was Vice Head of the Department of Basic Psychological Research within the Faculty of Psychology at the University of Vienna, and during 2006-08 additionally Vice Dean of the Faculty.

== Scientific Work ==
Formann led long-standing research collaborations with colleagues in the statistical, medical, and psychological sciences. His substantial research activities in all these fields are documented in numerous books and more than 50 publications in prestigious high-impact journals, including Biometrics, the Journal of the American Statistical Association, the British Journal of Mathematical and Statistical Psychology, and Psychometrika.

=== Item response theory (Rasch models) ===
Formann was one of the first researchers who documented problems with Rasch model tests, in particular with Andersen's likelihood-ratio test which arise under certain conditions if it is employed conventionally. As a senior author, Formann also showed that the common assumption that the EM estimation of the two-parameter logistic model is not influenced by initial values is incorrect.

==== Viennese Matrices Test ====
Formann was probably the first researcher to practically apply Fischer's linear logistic test model (LLTM) for test development. The LLTM is a special case of the Rasch model, which allows the construction of items with item difficulties based on the user's demand. This resulted in the development of a Rasch-scaled abstract reasoning test (based on Raven's matrices test) which has since been widely used in research and practice. A revised version of this language-free intelligence test that has been calibrated against large contemporary samples of men and women is forthcoming.

==== Latent Class Analysis ====
For his first habilitation (in psychology), Formann published a comprehensive monograph on latent class analysis which continues to be widely cited for its clarity, depth, and originality, and hence is considered a true modern classic on this topic.

=== Quantitative Methods for Research Synthesis (Meta-Analysis) ===
In his later research, Formann addressed, among other things, the problem of publication bias in meta-analytic research. He introduced a novel method that allows estimating the proportion of studies missing in meta-analysis due to publication bias based on the truncated normal distribution. In 2010, as the senior author, Formann debunked in a meta-analysis the famous Mozart effect as a myth.

=== Other ===
==== Newcomb-Benford Law ====
Formann provided an alternative explanation for the Newcomb-Benford law – a formalisation of the remarkable observation that the frequencies with which the leading digits of numbers occur in large data sets are far away from being uniform (e.g., the leading digit 1 occurs in nearly one third of all cases). In addition to the prevailing explanations based on scale- and base invariance, Formann directed the attention to the interrelation between the distribution of the significant digits and the distribution of the observed variable. He showed in a simulation study that long right-tailed distributions of a random variable are compatible with the Newcomb-Benford law, and that for distributions of the ratio of two random variables the fit generally improves.

==== Piaget's Water Level Task ====
The water-level task refers to a task developed by Jean Piaget where bottles filled with different levels of water are presented in different angles of orientation. It is used to assess the level of mental development of spatial abilities (e.g., recognition of the invariance of horizontality). Formann criticized the established method of dichotomizing water-level responses by the subjects into "right" versus "wrong" – he showed that this method was inappropriate because it ignored the heterogeneity of the task difficulties - and instead recommended using latent class models or Rasch models. He showed that subjects and tasks can be arrayed on a unidimensional scale and, by employing the linear logistic test model, that the task difficulty could be attributed to a single parameter associated with the angle of inclination of the bottle. Furthermore, he provided the first empirical data of task performance of the elderly and found that there was an age-associated non-linear decline of performance.

==== Misconception of Probability ====
Formann compared the performance in the classic birthday problem (i.e., guessing the probability P for any coincidence among N individuals sharing the same birthday) and the birthmate problem (i.e., guessing the probability P for the specific coincidence among N individuals of having a birthday today) in psychology undergraduates, casino visitors, and casino employees. Psychology students and women did better on both task types, but were less confident about their estimates than casino visitors or personnel and men. Higher confidence ratings were related to subjective estimates that were closer to the solutions of birthday problems, but not of birthmate problems.

==== Parallel Analysis in Retrieving Unidimensionality in the Presence of Binary Data ====
Formann provided both theoretical and empirical evidence that the application of the parallel analysis for uncovering the factorial structure of binary variables is not appropriate. Results of a simulation study showed that sample size, item discrimination, and type of correlation coefficient considerably influence the performance of parallel analysis.

== Selected publications ==
=== Papers ===
- Formann, A. K. (1978). Note on parameter-estimation for Lazarsfeld latent class analysis. Psychometrika, 43, 123-126.
- Formann, A. K. (1985). Constrained latent class models: Theory and applications. British Journal of Mathematical and Statistical Psychology, 38, 87-111.
- Formann, A. K. (1986). A note on the computation of the 2nd-order derivatives of the elementary symmetrical functions in the Rasch model. Psychometrika, 51, 335-339.
- Formann, A. K., & Rop, I. (1987). On the inhomogeneity of a test compounded of 2 Rasch homogeneous subscales. Psychometrika, 52, 263-267.
- Formann, A. K. (1988). Latent class models for nonmonotone dichotomous items. Psychometrika, 53, 45-62.
- Formann, A. K. (1989). Constrained latent class models: Some further applications. British Journal of Mathematical and Statistical Psychology, 42, 37-54.
- Formann, A. K. (1992). Linear logistic latent class analysis for polytomous data. Journal of the American Statistical Association, 87, 476-486.
- Formann, A. K. (1993). Fixed-distance latent class models for the analysis of sets of two-way contingency tables. Biometrics, 49, 511-521.
- Formann, A. K. (1994). Measurement errors in caries diagnosis: Some further latent class models. Biometrics, 50, 865-871.
- Formann, A. K. (1994). Measuring change in latent subgroups using dichotomous data: Unconditional, conditional, and semiparametric maximum-likelihood-estimation. Journal of the American Statistical Association, 89, 1027-1034.
- Formann, A. K., & Kohlmann, T. (1996). Latent class analysis in medical research. Statistical Methods in Medical Research, 5, 179-211.
- Formann, A. K., & Kohlmann, T. (1998). Structural latent class models. Sociological Methods and Research, 26, 530-565.
- Formann, A. K. (2001). Misspecifying latent class models by mixture binomials. British Journal of Mathematical and Statistical Psychology, 54, 279-291.
- Formann, A. K., & Ponocny, I. (2002). Latent change classes in dichotomous data. Psychometrika, 67, 437-457.
- Formann, A. K. (2003). Latent class model diagnosis from a frequentist point of view. Biometrics, 59, 189-196.
- Formann, A. K. (2003). Modeling data from water-level tasks: A test theoretical analysis. Perceptual and Motor Skills, 96, 1153-1172.
- Voracek, M., & Formann, A. K. (2004). Variation in European suicide rates is better accounted for by latitude and longitude than by national percentage of Finno-Ugrians and Type O blood: A rebuttal of Lester and Kondrichin (2004). Perceptual and Motor Skills, 99, 1243-1250.
- Formann, A. K. (2006). Mixture analysis of longitudinal binary data. Statistics in Medicine, 25, 1457-1469.
- Formann, A. K. (2006). Testing the Rasch model by means of the mixture fit index. British Journal of Mathematical and Statistical Psychology, 59, 89-95.
- Formann, A. K. (2007). Mixture analysis of multivariate categorical data with covariates and missing entries. Computational Statistics and Data Analysis, 51, 5236-5246.
- Formann, A. K. (2008). Estimating the proportion of studies missing for meta-analysis due to publication bias. Contemporary Clinical Trials, 29, 732-739.
- Formann, A. K., & Böhning, D. (2008). Re: Insights into latent class analysis of diagnostic test performance. Biostatistics, 9, 777-778.
- Tran, U. S., & Formann, A. K. (2008). Piaget's water-level tasks: Performance across the lifespan with emphasis on the elderly. Personality and Individual Differences, 45, 232-237.
- Voracek, M., Tran, U. S., & Formann, A. K. (2008). Birthday and birthmate problems: Misconceptions of probability among psychology undergraduates and casino visitors and personnel. Perceptual and Motor Skills, 106, 91-103.
- Tran, U. S., & Formann, A. K. (2009). Performance of parallel analysis in retrieving unidimensionality in the presence of binary data. Educational and Psychological Measurement, 69, 50-61.
- Formann, A. K. (2010). The Newcomb-Benford law in its relation to some common distributions. PLoS ONE, 5, e10541.
- Voracek, M., Gabler, D., Kreutzer, C., Stieger, S., Swami, V., & Formann, A. K. (2010). Multi-method personality assessment of butchers and hunters: Beliefs and reality. Personality and Individual Differences, 49, 819-822.
- Voracek, M., Tran, U. S., Fischer-Kern, M., Formann, A. K., & Springer-Kremser, M. (2010). Like father, like son? Familial aggregation of physicians among medical and psychology students in Austria. Higher Education, 59, 737-748.
- Pietschnig, J., Voracek, M., & Formann, A. K. (2010). Mozart effect––Shmozart effect: A meta-analysis. Intelligence, 38, 314-323.
- Pietschnig, J., Voracek, M., & Formann, A. K. (2010). Pervasiveness of the IQ rise: A cross-temporal meta-analysis. PLoS ONE, 5, e14406.
- Nader, I. W., Tran, U. S., & Formann, A. K. (2011). Sensitivity to initial values in full non-parametric maximum-likelihood estimation of the two-parameter logistic model. British Journal of Mathematical and Statistical Psychology, 64, 320-336.
- Pietschnig, J., Voracek, M., & Formann, A. K. (2011). Female Flynn effects: No sex differences in generational IQ gains. Personality and Individual Differences, 50, 759-762.
- Stieger, S., Formann, A. K., & Burger, C. (2011). Humor styles and their relationship to explicit and implicit self-esteem. Personality and Individual Differences, 50, 747-750.
- Stieger, S., Voracek, M., & Formann, A. K. (2012). How to administer the Initial Preference Task. European Journal of Personality, 26, 63-78.
- Preinerstorfer, D., & Formann, A. K. (2012). Parameter recovery and model selection in mixed Rasch models. British Journal of Mathematical and Statistical Psychology, 65, 251-262.
- Holling, H., Böhning, W., Böhning, D., & Formann, A. K. (2013). The covariate-adjusted frequency plot. Statistical Methods in Medical Research, 25, 902-916.

=== Books ===
- Formann, A. K., & Piswanger, K. (1979). Wiener Matrizen-Test. Ein Rasch-skalierter sprachfreier Intelligenztest [Viennese Matrices Test: A Rasch-scaled culture-fair intelligence test]. Weinheim: Beltz.
- Formann, A. K. (1984). Latent Class Analyse: Einführung in die Theorie und Anwendung [Latent class analysis: Introduction to theory and application]. Weinheim: Beltz.
- Formann, A. K., Waldherr, K., & Piswanger, K. (2011). Wiener Matrizen-Test 2 (WMT-2): Ein Rasch-skalierter sprachfreier Kurztest zur Erfassung der Intelligenz [Viennese Matrices Test 2: A Rasch-scaled language-free short test for the assessment of intelligence]. Göttingen: Hogrefe.

== See also ==
- Item response theory (Rasch models)
- Latent class analysis
- Mixture model
- Categorical data analysis
- Quantitative methods for research synthesis (meta-analysis)
- Publication bias
- Newcomb-Benford law
- Mozart effect
- University of Vienna
