= Kentucky Inventory of Mindfulness Skills =

- Purpose: measures mindfulness

The Kentucky Inventory of Mindfulness Skills (KIMS) is a 39-item self-report measuring mindfulness on four scales: observing, describing, act with awareness, and accept without judgment. It was developed at Kentucky University by Baer, Smith, & Allen in 2004. A short, 20-item version of it (KIMS-Short) was developed in Germany in 2011 and enables researchers to replicate the basic factor structure. However KIMS-Short shows the Observing subscale as comprising two different but strongly correlated factors depending on whether the observed stimuli are internal or external. Good support has been found for the model of four correlated factors, and the scales have been found to be both highly internally consistent and sensitive to change through Mindfulness-Based Cognitive Therapy.

== Relation with behavior ==
The four scales have been positively correlated with social activity.
