= William Stephenson (psychologist) =

William Stephenson

William Stephenson (May 14, 1902 – June 14, 1989) was a psychologist and physicist best known for developing Q methodology.

He was born in England and trained in physics at the University of Oxford and Durham University (where he earned a Ph.D. in 1926). His interest in research methods in physics and complementarity led him to an increased interest in psychology. This resulted in his studying at University College London under Charles Spearman, a pioneer of factor analysis. While there he also worked with Cyril Burt. Stephenson received his second Ph.D., in psychology, in 1929.

Stephenson is most known for his development of an alternative form of factorial analysis concerned with the operationalizing of subjectivity, Q methodology. At the same time as he published his first paper on Q methodology in Nature in 1935, he was in analysis with Melanie Klein (in 1935–36), as part of a project initiated by the British Psycho-Analytic Society to promote research on psychoanalysis within academic psychology.

In 1936 he became the assistant director of Oxford's Institute of Experimental Psychology.

During the Second World War he joined the British military and was promoted to the rank of Brigadier General, serving in India.

After the war he briefly returned to Oxford but left in 1948 for the University of Chicago. It was while he was at Chicago that he published The Study of Behavior: Q-Technique and Its Methodology (1953), the work for which he is best known and the definitive treatise on the research procedure.

In 1955 he left the University of Chicago, and academia, to accept a position as director of advertising research for Nowland and Company. His time in the advertising world, though successful, was short-lived, and he returned to academia in 1958, accepting a position as a distinguished professor in the University of Missouri School of Journalism. He retired from Missouri in 1974 but accepted a position as a visiting professor at the University of Iowa where he served until a second retirement in 1977.

After retirement he continued to write on his interest in the subject of the study of subjectivity until his death in 1989 at the age of 87 (Barchak, 1991).

== Selected publications ==
- Stephenson, W. (1935). Technique of factor analysis. Nature, 136, 297.
- Stephenson, W. (1935). Correlating persons instead of tests. Character and Personality, 4, 17–24.
- Stephenson, W. (1936). The foundations of psychometry: Four factor systems. Psychometrika, 1, 195–209.
- Stephenson, W. (1953). The study of behavior: Q-technique and its methodology. Chicago: University of Chicago Press.
- Stephenson, W. (1961). Scientific creed—1961: Abductory principles. Psychological Record, 11, 9–17.
- Stephenson, W. (1967). The play theory of mass communication. Chicago: University of Chicago Press. (Reprinted: New Brunswick, NJ: Transaction Books, 1988.)
- Stephenson, W. (1973). APPLICATIONS OF COMMUNICATION THEORY III-INTELLIGENCE AND MULTIVALUED CHOICE. Psychological Record, 23, 17–32.
- Stephenson, W. (1977). Factors as operant subjectivity. Operant Subjectivity, 1, 3–16.
- Stephenson, W. (1978). Concourse theory of communication. Communication, 3, 21–40.
- Stephenson, W. (1980). Factor analysis. Operant Subjectivity, 3,38-57.
- Stephenson, W. (1980). Consciring: A general theory for subjective communicability. In D. Nimmo (Ed.), Communication yearbook 4 (pp. 7–36). New Brunswick, NJ: Transaction Books.
- Stephenson, W. (1982). Q-methodology, interbehavioral psychology, and quantum theory. Psychological Record, 32, 235–248.
- Stephenson, W. (1983). Against interpretation. Operant Subjectivity, 6, 73–103, 109–125.
- Stephenson, W. (1986). Protoconcursus: The concourse theory of communication. Operant Subjectivity, 9, 37–58, 73–96.
- Stephenson, W. (1986-1988). William James, Niels Bohr, and complementarity: I-V. Psychological Record, vols 36–38.
- Stephenson, W. (1987). Q-methodology: Interbehavioral and quantum theoretical connections in clinical psychology. In D.H. Ruben & D.J. Delprato (Eds.), New ideas in therapy (pp. 95–106). Westport, CT: Greenwood.
- Stephenson, W. (1988). Quantum theory of subjectivity. Integrative Psychiatry, 6, 180–187.
- Stephenson, W. (1990). My self in 1980: A study of culture. Operant Subjectivity, 14, 1–19.
- Stephenson, W. (1990). Fifty years of exclusionary psychometrics: I-II. Operant Subjectivity, 13, 105–120, 141-162
