= Kelvyn Jones =

Welsh human geographer (born 1953)

Kelvyn Jones FBA, FLSW, FAcSS
- Jones in 2021
- Born: 31 October 1953 (age 72); Rhondda, Wales
- Education: BSc, PhD, University of Southampton
- Known for: Contributions to Multilevel Modelling; Health Geography
- Awards: Murchison Award, 2013
- Scientific career
- Fields: Quantitative social science, Human Geography
- Workplaces: University of Newcastle, University College Swansea, University of Reading, Portsmouth Polytechnic, University of Portsmouth, Bristol University, University of Leuven
- Thesis: Geographical Variations in Mortality (1980)
- Doctoral advisors: Neil Wrigley, David Pinder

Kelvyn Jones, FBA, FAcSS, FLSW (born 31 October 1953) is a British professor (Emeritus) of human quantitative geography at the University of Bristol. He focuses on the quantitative modelling of social science data with complex structure through the application of multilevel models; especially in relation to change and health outcomes. Uniquely he is an elected Fellow of the British Academy, the Academy of the Social Sciences and the Learned Society of Wales.

== Academic controversies ==
He has been involved in a number of academic controversies, and these debates have been of a methodological and substantive nature. They include:

- He has disagreed with the Wilkinson inequality hypothesis that within country differences in health and mortality are driven by invidious comparison; instead arguing that there is a materialist argument based on poverty even in advanced economies. The argument is based on critique of Wilkinson's use of aggregate data and supports the ideas of Hugh Gravelle that if there is a non-linear individual relationship between income and ill-health then the aggregate relationship will necessarily involve the 'spread' (standard deviation) of country income that is inequality. A 2025 meta analysis of 168 studies using multilevel data (11,389,871 participants from 38,335 geographical units) found no effect of economic inequality on well-being or mental health.
- He has argued against Growth in a Time of Debt thesis and (with Andy Bell) re-analyzed the Reinhart and Rogoff data to show that the evidence for many counties is that the relationship is around the other way - the lack of growth produces debt, and that the relationship between debt and growth varies significantly between countries, meaning that an average "rule", such as that suggested by Reinhart and Rogoff, has little meaning or policy relevance.
- With colleagues, he has argued against Trevor Phillips that the UK is 'sleep walking to segregation', finding that ethnic residential segregation in London for example is decreasing. They dispute that Muslim ghettoes are developing in British cities, and that Australian suburbs are being 'swamped' by Asians and Muslims.
- He has argued that quantitative analysis in the form of quantitative geography has an important role in emancipatory human geography (see critical geography). He has argued that this involves adopting a realist philosophy of science distinguished as critical realism and not positivism. The arguments are made in "The Practice of Quantitative Methods" and are further developed and exemplified with colleagues in "Mutual misunderstanding and avoidance, misrepresentations and disciplinary politics: spatial science and quantitative analysis in (United Kingdom) geographical curricula" and a subsequent extended reply to critics in "One step forward but two steps back to the proper appreciation of spatial science". One commentator described this as "an extraordinary contribution. This is a panoramic survey of the legacy of half a century of innovation in spatial science—put into a critical, constructive engagement with half a century of innovation in critical social theory".
- He (with colleagues) has challenged the 'gold standard' that fixed effects should be the standard approach to the analysis of Panel data and that a Hausman test is an appropriate way of choosing between a Fixed effects model and a Random effects model. Somewhat controversially they argue that a particular form of the random effects model (the within-between model or the similar Mundlak model) offers all that fixed effects can provide and more. They also challenge the Fixed Effects Vector Decomposition (FEVD) model of Plumper and Troeger. One reaction was: "This paper and the instructive controversial over FEVD have shown me that my econometrics training had not - as I once assumed - taught me all that there is to know about fixed effects estimation. In particular, the authors' treatment of 'heterogeneity bias' clarifies the importance of addressing both 'within' and 'between' variation in the data and they make a compelling case for considering both 'individual' and 'ecological' influences". Another was: "Bizarre and often incorrect paper by two political scientists on the virtues of random-effects over fixed-effects". to "You can and should use a well-specified random effects model. Always.". These models shown algebraically in the table for a two-level panel model
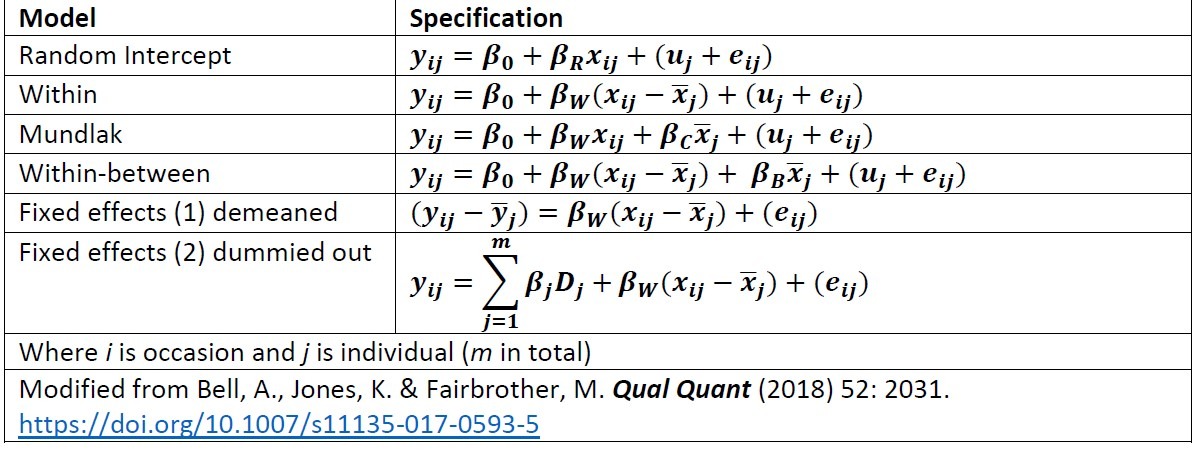
  are discussed and illustrated with snippets of R code by Daniel Lüdecke, and there is a R package (panelr) for panel data analysis by Jacob Long that facilitates their implementation. An extensive review of the potential of this approach in economics concluded that it has been "unreasonably ignored" due in part to "disciplinary isolation" of the subject. In the psychological literature, Hamaker and Muthén, (2020) report that “The most elaborate and animated treatment of the connection [between FE versus RE models and centering in multilevel models] can be found in the recent paper of Bell and Jones (2015). They build a compelling case for multilevel modelling, arguing that, while the problem of endogeneity is very real, the point is that we should simply use the right multilevel model to tackle it (i.e., based on person mean centering the time-varying covariate and/or including these means as a predictor at the between-level)”
- He and colleagues argue that group-mean centering in multilevel models can be a useful procedure in random coefficient models, thereby disagreeing that it is a 'dangerous' procedure. Reactions to this critique include "may the Saints & Angels protect us from ever having a paper this thoroughly dismantled" and "Seriously though, if you are interested in multilevel modelling I highly recommend this short, instructive and frankly rather sassy paper." The essence of the argument is that in a two-level model, the slope parameter associated with level-1 variable is a potentially uninterpretable mixture of within and between effects. The solution is to decentre the level-1 variable by subtracting the level 2 cluster mean and including these level 2 means in the model. The argument is made in terms of continuous variables and is extended to multicategory predictors by Yaremych et al (2021).
- He contends that even with population data (e.g. a full enumeration of all pupils in all schools in a country), a statistical inference approach is required to deal with stochastic or natural variation. Observed outcomes are seen as a result of a stochastic process which could produce different results under the same circumstances. It is this underlying process that is of interest and the actual observed values give only an imprecise estimate of this.
- Working with Andy Bell, he has argued that the multilevel model (in the form of the hierarchical-age–period–cohort (HAPC) model) is not an automatic solution to the identification problem of the age period cohort model. This third-party site considers some earlier papers in the exchange between Bell and Jones and Yang and Land, while this most recent paper gives in Table 1 the key papers (and arguments made).; the full list of papers that Bell and Jones have written are available for download from Research Gate. A review of the debate is given by Barker, KM et al (2020) Cross-classified multilevel models (CCMM) in health research: A systematic review of published empirical studies and recommendations for best practices, SSM - Population Health, Volume 12. They conclude "Bell and Jones (2018) have done much to explicate the debate, the ‘identification problem,’ and the methodological concerns. Despite this, the vast majority of researchers continue to employ CCMM for APC analysis without reference to the identification problem, the controversy itself, or any of the latest recommendations for best practices. Those that do refer to the identification problem often note this only within the limitations section of the manuscript. In light of the ongoing debate surrounding these methods, however, we urge substantial caution when conducting APC analysis and recommend a more meaningful engagement with the logic underlying the controversy. "

== Academic work and projects ==
He researches in three main areas:

- Geography of health: particularly geographical inequalities in mortality in advanced economies;
- Research design: especially to develop evidence-based research in non-experimental, observational studies;
- Realistically complex modelling: this research work focuses on the quantitative analysis of social-science data with complex structure, particularly when there are many levels of analysis such as panels, spatial series, and space-time series.

His substantive and methodological work is wide-ranging and includes the following bodies of work:

Substantive research

- Geography of health
- Macro determinants of health;
- Multilevel modelling of health-related behaviors and outcomes
- Multilevel modelling of mental health outcomes
- Multilevel modelling of social capital, trust and volunteering
- Multilevel modelling of voting behaviors and electoral outcomes
- Forecasting geographical variations in the EU referendum
- Multilevel modelling of socio-demographic variation in China
- Modelling segregation: applying the new methodologies
- Multilevel modelling of property(house) prices
- Multilevel modelling of sporting outcomes

Methodological research

- Quantitative geography
- Statistical data analysis in the social sciences
- Multilevel modelling: scope, models and issues
- Multilevel analysis, software, manuals and data
- Fixed and Random effects analysis
- Modelling nationally predicting locally (multilevel regression with post stratification)
- Modelling segregation: methodological developments; this includes work on the modifiable areal unit problem;
- Modelling interactions: analysis of large tables of counts using a Poisson random effects model
- Age period cohort analysis A recent review Cross-classified multilevel models (CCMM) in health research: A systematic review of published empirical studies and recommendations for best practices, the article says "Bell and Jones (2018) have done much to explicate the debate, the ‘identification problem,’ and the methodological concerns. Despite this, the vast majority of researchers continue to employ CCMM for APC analysis without reference to the identification problem, the controversy itself, or any of the latest recommendations for best practices. "

== Access to publications and citations ==
- A Google Scholar profile gives up-to-date citation of his work; as of January 2025 his H-index score is 70.
- He makes available much of his academic output on ResearchGate, where he frequently answers questions on statistical (especially multilevel) modeling. He has also explained his reasons for doing so in answer to a question on the site. As of February 2022, he has over 1.4 million 'reads' on ResearchGate and this is accruing at a rate of around 1,000 per week.
- There are also a ResearcherID site, an ORCID site and a database of publications at the University of Bristol.

== Posts held ==
University of Newcastle, 1978-1979, Lecturer in Geography,; University College Swansea, 1979-1980, Lecturer in Geography; University of Reading, 1980-1981 SSRC Postdoctoral Fellow; Portsmouth Polytechnic (post 1992, University of Portsmouth) 1981- 1994, Lecturer, Principal Lecturer, Reader; Portsmouth University, 1994-2000, Professor of Geography (Personal Chair), Head of School (1997-2000); Catholic University of Brussels, 1992-2011, Professor of Social Science Methodology; University of Bristol, 2001-2018 Professor of Geography, (Personal Chair) (Head of School, 2005-2009 ); University of Bristol, 2018- Emeritus Professor of Geography; University of Leuven, 2011-2018 Professor at Leuven Statistics Research Centre (LStat).

His and other reflections on his time at Portsmouth (Polytechnic and University) were produced on his election to the British Academy

Voluntary positions include: RAE Panel Member for Geography 2001; RAE Panel Member for Geography and Environmental Studies 2008; Board Member of Bristol University Press, 2018-; Member of Understanding Society Scientific Advisory Committee, 2018-; Scrutiny Committee for Fellowship of the Learned Society of Wales (Economic and Social Sciences, Education and Law), 2016-.

== Recognition and awards ==
The election to a Fellowship of the British Academy was in 2016 and he was elected both to Sociology, Demography and Social Statistics (Section 4) and to Anthropology and Geography (Section 3)). The citation on election reads ‘Kelvyn Jones is an internationally leading quantitative social scientist. He has made major contributions to the analysis and interpretation of large and complex data sets in a broad field of quantitative social sciences, including geography, and is extremely active in promoting training in quantitative analysis in the social sciences.” He is also a Fellow of the Learned Society of Wales, having been elected in 2013, and an Academician of the Social Sciences, elected in 2008. He was awarded the Murchison Award of the Royal Geographical Society in 2013 for his contribution to quantitative geography; an account of the ceremony was published in The Geographical Journal.

2019 Market Research Society Silver Medal: he was part of the team (Ron Johnston, David Rossiter, Todd Hartman, Charles Pattie, David Manley and Kelvyn Jones) that won this award for best research paper, "Exploring constituency-level estimates for the 2017 British general election", which discusses the implications of constituency-level opinion polls as their predictive ability is improved.

As of 2009, he was listed in the top 20 most cited human geographers of the last half century. and since then his h-index as measured by Web of Science Researcher ID (Publons) has increased from 20 to 44 in 2024; comparable figures for different social sciences can be found in the LSE impact blog. His Rgate Score as of May 2022 is over 400, and that compares to the outlying high scores of over 100 identified by E. Oduna-Malea et al., 2017 reflecting his willingness to answer questions.

== Postgraduate teaching and supervision ==
He has taught a course on multilevel modeling annually at the Essex Summer School in Social Science Data analysis since 1992 and is a long term contributor to the Masters in Statistics and the Masters in Quantitative Social Science at the Leuven Statistics Research Centre. He also two led two five-day workshops (2009 and 2011) in Pennsylvania State University and UC Santa Barbara under the aegis of GISpopsci.org.

He has supervised a number of students for their PhD; they include:

- Andrew Clegg
- Craig Duncan
- Nina Bullen
- SV Subramanian
- Sarah Johns
- Katherine French
- Min-Hua Jen
- Beatriz Caicedo Velasquez
- Caroline Wright- Commendations for PhD thesis and viva in the academic year 2014-15
- Zhixin 'Frank' Feng -winner of the 2013 Faculty Research Prize
- Andrew Bell
- Dewi Owen
- Yingyu Feng
- Gwilym Owen- Winner of the Faculty prize for Best Doctoral Research Thesis 2016/17
- Gareth Griffith,
- Lucy Prior

== Major publications ==
Book length publications include:

- Jones, Kelvyn and Moon, Graham (1987). Health, disease and society: a critical medical geography, Routledge & Kegan Paul Ltd, London.
- Jones Kelvyn (1991). Multi-level Models for Geographical Research, Environmental Publications, Norwich.
- Moon, Graham; Gould, Myles; Jones, Kelvyn et al. (2000). Epidemiology, Open University Press, Buckingham.
- Mohan, John; Barnard, Steve; Jones, Kelvyn and Twigg, Lizbeth (2004). Social capital, place and health: creating, validating and applying small-area indicators in the modelling of health outcomes, Health Development Agency.
- Jones, Kelvyn and Subramanian, SV (2014). Developing multilevel models for analysing contextuality, heterogeneity and change using MLwiN, Volume 1, Centre for Multilevel Modelling, University of Bristol, United Kingdom.
- Jones, Kelvyn and Subramanian, SV (2013). Developing multilevel models for analysing contextuality, heterogeneity and change using MLwiN, Volume 2, Centre for Multilevel Modelling, University of Bristol, United Kingdom.

== Personal life ==
He married Christina Thrush in 1979; Tina died of Breast Cancer in 2020. His hobbies are listening to classical music, especially opera and song; gardening and 'allotmenteering', cooking, wine tasting and watching Bristol Rugby. They have a son, Alex, born in 1987 who is a Fellow of the Royal College of Anaesthetists.
