= Restricted randomization =

In statistics, restricted randomization, also known as constrained randomization, occurs in the design of experiments and in particular in the context of randomized experiments and randomized controlled trials. Restricted randomization allows intuitively poor allocations of treatments to experimental units to be avoided, while retaining the theoretical benefits of randomization. For example, in a clinical trial of a new proposed treatment of obesity compared to a control, an experimenter would want to avoid outcomes of the randomization in which the new treatment was allocated only to the heaviest patients. The goal of improving the balance between the treatment and control groups could be obtained using rerandomization, which is a form of restricted randomization in which allocations that fail a pre-specified covariate-balance criterion are discarded and the units are randomized again; this improves the precision of estimated treatment effects, but the analysis then has to account for the restriction. It has also been argued that the additional choices this involves, such as which covariates to balance and how to adjust p-values, give researchers more room for p-hacking.

The concept was introduced by Frank Yates (1948) and William J. Youden (1972) "as a way of avoiding bad spatial patterns of treatments in designed experiments."

== Example of nested data ==
Consider a batch process that uses 7 monitor wafers in each run. The plan further calls for measuring a response variable on each wafer at each of 9 sites. The organization of the sampling plan has a hierarchical or nested structure: the batch run is the topmost level, the second level is an individual wafer, and the third level is the site on the wafer.

The total amount of data generated per batch run will be 7 · 9 = 63 observations. One approach to analyzing these data would be to compute the mean of all these points as well as their standard deviation and use those results as responses for each run.

Analyzing the data as suggested above is not absolutely incorrect, but doing so loses information that one might otherwise obtain. For example, site 1 on wafer 1 is physically different from site 1 on wafer 2 or on any other wafer. The same is true for any of the sites on any of the wafers. Similarly, wafer 1 in run 1 is physically different from wafer 1 in run 2, and so on. To describe this situation one says that sites are nested within wafers while wafers are nested within runs.

As a consequence of this nesting, there are restrictions on the randomization that can occur in the experiment. This kind of restricted randomization always produces nested sources of variation. Examples of nested variation or restricted randomization discussed on this page are split-plot and strip-plot designs.

The objective of an experiment with this type of sampling plan is generally to reduce the variability due to sites on the wafers and wafers within runs (or batches) in the process. The sites on the wafers and the wafers within a batch become sources of unwanted variation and an investigator seeks to make the system robust to those sources—in other words, one could treat wafers and sites as noise factors in such an experiment.

Because the wafers and the sites represent unwanted sources of variation and because one of the objectives is to reduce the process sensitivity to these sources of variation, treating wafers and sites as random effects in the analysis of the data is a reasonable approach. In other words, nested variation is often another way of saying nested random effects or nested sources of noise. If the factors "wafers" and "sites" are treated as random effects, then it is possible to estimate a variance component due to each source of variation through analysis of variance techniques. Once estimates of the variance components have been obtained, an investigator is then able to determine the largest source of variation in the process under experimentation, and also determine the magnitudes of the other sources of variation in relation to the largest source.

== Nested random effects ==
If an experiment or process has nested variation, the experiment or process has multiple sources of random error that affect its output. Having nested random effects in a model is the same thing as having nested variation in a model.

== Split-plot designs ==
Split-plot designs result when a particular type of restricted randomization has occurred during the experiment. A simple factorial experiment can result in a split-plot type of design because of the way the experiment was actually executed.

In many industrial experiments, three situations often occur:

1. some of the factors of interest may be 'hard to vary' while the remaining factors are easy to vary. As a result, the order in which the treatment combinations for the experiment are run is determined by the ordering of these 'hard-to-vary' factors
2. experimental units are processed together as a batch for one or more of the factors in a particular treatment combination
3. experimental units are processed individually, one right after the other, for the same treatment combination without resetting the factor settings for that treatment combination.

=== Split-plot experimental examples ===
An experiment run under one of the above three situations usually results in a split-plot type of design. Consider an experiment to examine electroplating of aluminum (non-aqueous) on copper strips. The three factors of interest are: current (A); solution temperature (T); and the solution concentration of the plating agent (S). Plating rate is the measured response. There are a total of 16 copper strips available for the experiment. The treatment combinations to be run (orthogonally scaled) are listed below in standard order (i.e., they have not been randomized):

Orthogonally scaled treatment combinations from a 2^{3} full factorial
Current	Temperature	Concentration
−1	−1	−1
−1	−1	+1
−1	+1	−1
−1	+1	+1
+1	−1	−1
+1	−1	+1
+1	+1	−1
+1	+1	+1

==== Example: some factors hard to vary ====
Consider running the experiment under the first condition listed above, with the factor solution concentration of the plating agent (S) being hard to vary. Since this factor is hard to vary, the experimenter would like to randomize the treatment combinations so that the solution concentration factor has a minimal number of changes. In other words, the randomization of the treatment runs is restricted somewhat by the level of the solution concentration factor.

As a result, the treatment combinations might be randomized such that those treatment runs corresponding to one level of the concentration (−1) are run first. Each copper strip is individually plated, meaning only one strip at a time is placed in the solution for a given treatment combination. Once the four runs at the low level of solution concentration have been completed, the solution is changed to the high level of concentration (1), and the remaining four runs of the experiment are performed (where again, each strip is individually plated).

Once one complete replicate of the experiment has been completed, a second replicate is performed with a set of four copper strips processed for a given level of solution concentration before changing the concentration and processing the remaining four strips. Note that the levels for the remaining two factors can still be randomized. In addition, the level of concentration that is run first in the replication runs can also be randomized.

Running the experiment in this way results in a split-plot design. Solution concentration is known as the whole plot factor and the subplot factors are the current and the solution temperature.

A split-plot design has more than one size experimental unit. In this experiment, one size experimental unit is an individual copper strip. The treatments or factors that were applied to the individual strips are solution temperature and current (these factors were changed each time a new strip was placed in the solution). The other or larger size experimental unit is a set of four copper strips. The treatment or factor that was applied to a set of four strips is solution concentration (this factor was changed after four strips were processed). The smaller size experimental unit is referred to as the subplot experimental unit, while the larger experimental unit is referred to as the whole plot unit.

There are 16 subplot experimental units for this experiment. Solution temperature and current are the subplot factors in this experiment. There are four whole-plot experimental units in this experiment. Solution concentration is the whole-plot factor in this experiment. Since there are two sizes of experimental units, there are two error terms in the model, one that corresponds to the whole-plot error or whole-plot experimental unit and one that corresponds to the subplot error or subplot experimental unit.

The ANOVA table for this experiment would look, in part, as follows:

Partial ANOVA table
Source	DF
Replication	1
Concentration	1
Error (whole plot) = Rep × Conc	1
Temperature	1
Rep × Temp	1
Current	1
Rep × Current	1
Temp × Conc	1
Rep × Temp × Conc	1
Temp × Current	1
Rep × Temp × Current	1
Current × Conc	1
Rep × Current × Conc	1
Temp × Current × Conc	1
Error (Subplot) = Rep × Temp × Current × Conc	1

The first three sources are from the whole-plot level, while the next 12 are from the subplot portion. A normal probability plot of the 12 subplot term estimates could be used to look for statistically significant terms.

==== Example: batch process ====
Consider running the experiment under the second condition listed above (i.e., a batch process) for which four copper strips are placed in the solution at one time. A specified level of current can be applied to an individual strip within the solution. The same 16 treatment combinations (a replicated 2^{3} factorial) are run as were run under the first scenario. However, the way in which the experiment is performed would be different. There are four treatment combinations of solution temperature and solution concentration: (−1, −1), (−1, 1), (1, −1), (1, 1). The experimenter randomly chooses one of these four treatments to set up first. Four copper strips are placed in the solution. Two of the four strips are randomly assigned to the low current level. The remaining two strips are assigned to the high current level. The plating is performed and the response is measured. A second treatment combination of temperature and concentration is chosen and the same procedure is followed. This is done for all four temperature / concentration combinations.

Running the experiment in this way also results in a split-plot design in which the whole-plot factors are now solution concentration and solution temperature, and the subplot factor is current.

In this experiment, one size experimental unit is again an individual copper strip. The treatment or factor that was applied to the individual strips is current (this factor was changed each time for a different strip within the solution). The other or larger size experimental unit is again a set of four copper strips. The treatments or factors that were applied to a set of four strips are solution concentration and solution temperature (these factors were changed after four strips were processed).

The smaller size experimental unit is again referred to as the subplot experimental unit. There are 16 subplot experimental units for this experiment. Current is the subplot factor in this experiment.

The larger-size experimental unit is the whole-plot experimental unit. There are four whole plot experimental units in this experiment and solution concentration and solution temperature are the whole plot factors in this experiment.

There are two sizes of experimental units and there are two error terms in the model: one that corresponds to the whole-plot error or whole-plot experimental unit, and one that corresponds to the subplot error or subplot experimental unit.

The ANOVA for this experiment looks, in part, as follows:

Partial ANOVA table
Source	DF
Concentration	1
Temperature	1
Error (whole plot) = Conc × Temp	1
Current	1
Conc × Current	1
Temp × Current	1
Conc × Temp × Current	1
Error (subplot)	8

The first three sources come from the whole-plot level and the next 5 come from the subplot level. Since there are 8 degrees of freedom for the subplot error term, this MSE can be used to test each effect that involves current.

==== Example: experimental units processed individually ====
Consider running the experiment under the third scenario listed above. There is only one copper strip in the solution at one time. However, two strips, one at the low current and one at the high current, are processed one right after the other under the same temperature and concentration setting. Once two strips have been processed, the concentration is changed and the temperature is reset to another combination. Two strips are again processed, one after the other, under this temperature and concentration setting. This process is continued until all 16 copper strips have been processed.

Running the experiment in this way also results in a split-plot design in which the whole-plot factors are again solution concentration and solution temperature and the subplot factor is current. In this experiment, one size experimental unit is an individual copper strip. The treatment or factor that was applied to the individual strips is current (this factor was changed each time for a different strip within the solution). The other or larger-size experimental unit is a set of two copper strips. The treatments or factors that were applied to a pair of two strips are solution concentration and solution temperature (these factors were changed after two strips were processed). The smaller size experimental unit is referred to as the subplot experimental unit.

There are 16 subplot experimental units for this experiment. Current is the subplot factor in the experiment. There are eight whole-plot experimental units in this experiment. Solution concentration and solution temperature are the whole plot factors. There are two error terms in the model, one that corresponds to the whole-plot error or whole-plot experimental unit, and one that corresponds to the subplot error or subplot experimental unit.

The ANOVA for this (third) approach is, in part, as follows:

Partial ANOVA table
Source	DF
Concentration	1
Temperature	1
Conc*Temp	1
Error (whole plot)	4
Current	1
Conc × Current	1
Temp × Current	1
Conc × Temp × Current	1
Error (subplot)	4

The first four terms come from the whole-plot analysis and the next 5 terms come from the subplot analysis. Note that we have separate error terms for both the whole plot and the subplot effects, each based on 4 degrees of freedom.

As can be seen from these three scenarios, one of the major differences in split-plot designs versus simple factorial designs is the number of different sizes of experimental units in the experiment. Split-plot designs have more than one size experimental unit, i.e., more than one error term. Since these designs involve different sizes of experimental units and different variances, the standard errors of the various mean comparisons involve one or more of the variances. Specifying the appropriate model for a split-plot design involves being able to identify each size of experimental unit. The way an experimental unit is defined relative to the design structure (for example, a completely randomized design versus a randomized complete block design) and the treatment structure (for example, a full 2^{3} factorial, a resolution V half fraction, a two-way treatment structure with a control group, etc.). As a result of having greater than one size experimental unit, the appropriate model used to analyze split-plot designs is a mixed model.

If the data from an experiment are analyzed with only one error term used in the model, misleading and invalid conclusions can be drawn from the results.

== Strip-plot designs ==
Similar to a split-plot design, a strip-plot design can result when some type of restricted randomization has occurred during the experiment. A simple factorial design can result in a strip-plot design depending on how the experiment was conducted. Strip-plot designs often result from experiments that are conducted over two or more process steps in which each process step is a batch process, i.e., completing each treatment combination of the experiment requires more than one processing step with experimental units processed together at each process step. As in the split-plot design, strip-plot designs result when the randomization in the experiment has been restricted in some way. As a result of the restricted randomization that occurs in strip-plot designs, there are multiple sizes of experimental units. Therefore, there are different error terms or different error variances that are used to test the factors of interest in the design. A traditional strip-plot design has three sizes of experimental units.

=== Strip-plot example: two steps and three factor variables ===
Consider the following example from the semiconductor industry. An experiment requires an implant step and an anneal step. At both the anneal and the implant steps there are three factors to test. The implant process accommodates 12 wafers in a batch, and implanting a single wafer under a specified set of conditions is not practical nor does doing so represent economical use of the implanter. The anneal furnace can handle up to 100 wafers.

The settings for a two-level factorial design for the three factors in the implant step are denoted (A, B, C), and a two-level factorial design for the three factors in the anneal step are denoted (D, E, F). Also present are interaction effects between the implant factors and the anneal factors. Therefore, this experiment contains three sizes of experimental units, each of which has a unique error term for estimating the significance of effects.

To put actual physical meaning to each of the experimental units in the above example, consider each combination of implant and anneal steps as an individual wafer. A batch of eight wafers goes through the implant step first. Treatment combination 3 in factors A, B, and C is the first implant treatment run. This implant treatment is applied to all eight wafers at once. Once the first implant treatment is finished, another set of eight wafers is implanted with treatment combination 5 of factors A, B, and C. This continues until the last batch of eight wafers is implanted with treatment combination 6 of factors A, B, and C. Once all of the eight treatment combinations of the implant factors have been run, the anneal step starts. The first anneal treatment combination to be run is treatment combination 5 of factors D, E, and F. This anneal treatment combination is applied to a set of eight wafers, with each of these eight wafers coming from one of the eight implant treatment combinations. After this first batch of wafers has been annealed, the second anneal treatment is applied to a second batch of eight wafers, with these eight wafers coming from one each of the eight implant treatment combinations. This is continued until the last batch of eight wafers has been implanted with a particular combination of factors D, E, and F.

Running the experiment in this way results in a strip-plot design with three sizes of experimental units. A set of eight wafers that are implanted together is the experimental unit for the implant factors A, B, and C and for all of their interactions. There are eight experimental units for the implant factors. A different set of eight wafers are annealed together. This different set of eight wafers is the second size experimental unit and is the experimental unit for the anneal factors D, E, and F and for all of their interactions. The third size experimental unit is a single wafer. This is the experimental unit for all of the interaction effects between the implant factors and the anneal factors.

Actually, the above description of the strip-plot design represents one block or one replicate of this experiment. If the experiment contains no replication and the model for the implant contains only the main effects and two-factor interactions, the three-factor interaction term A*B*C (1 degree of freedom) provides the error term for the estimation of effects within the implant experimental unit. Invoking a similar model for the anneal experimental unit produces the three-factor interaction term D*E*F for the error term (1 degree of freedom) for effects within the anneal experimental unit.

== See also ==
- Hierarchical linear modeling
- Mixed-design analysis of variance
- Multilevel model
- Nested case-control study
