= Seymour Geisser =

American statistician (1929–2004)

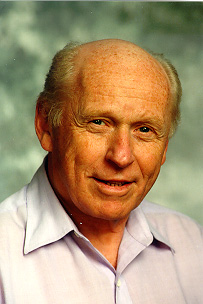
Geisser

Seymour Geisser (October 5, 1929 – March 11, 2004) was an American statistician noted for emphasizing predictive inference. In his book Predictive Inference: An Introduction, he held that conventional statistical inference about unobservable population parameters amounts to inference about things that do not exist, following the work of Bruno de Finetti. He also pioneered the theory of cross-validation.

With Samuel Greenhouse, he developed the Greenhouse–Geisser correction, which is now widely used in the analysis of variance to correct for violations of the assumption of compound symmetry.

He testified as an expert on interpretation of DNA evidence in more than 100 civil and criminal trials. He held that prosecutors often relied on flawed statistical models. On that topic, he wrote "Statistics, Litigation and Conduct Unbecoming" in the book Statistical Science in the Courtroom, edited by Joseph Gastwirth (Springer Verlag, 2000).

== Biography ==
He was born in New York City. He earned his Ph.D. at the University of North Carolina at Chapel Hill in 1955 under Harold Hotelling. In 1971, he founded the School of Statistics at the University of Minnesota, of which he was the Director for more than 30 years.

== Books ==
- Predictive Inference: An Introduction, CRC Press, 1993, ISBN 0-412-03471-9
- Modes of Parametric Statistical Inference, Wiley, 2006

Geisser was also the principal editor of several books of papers by multiple authors.

== Obituaries ==
- Berry, Donald A. (2005). "Seymour Geisser, 1929–2004". Journal of the Royal Statistical Society. Series A. 168: 245–6. doi:10.1111/j.1467-985X.2005.346_1.x.
- Christensen, Ronald and Wesley Johnson (2007). "A Conversation with Seymour Geisser". Statistical Science. 22 (4): 621–36, https://projecteuclid.org/euclid.ss/1207580175. arXiv:0804.3243. doi:10.1214/088342307000000131.
