= Samuel Greenhouse =

American statistician (1918–2000)

Samuel W. Greenhouse
- Born: April 13, 1918; The Bronx, New York, US
- Died: September 29, 2000 (aged 82); Rockville, Maryland, US
- Education: City College of New York; George Washington University
- Known for: Greenhouse–Geisser correction Work on applications of statistical methodology to epidemiology Role in the development of clinical trial methodology
- Awards: American Statistical Association Founders Award (1993)
- Scientific career
- Fields: Statistics
- Institutions: National Institutes of Health; George Washington University
- Thesis: Information theory and the statistical problem of discrimination (1959)
- Doctoral advisor: Solomon Kullback

Samuel W. Greenhouse (January 13, 1918 – September 29, 2000) was an American statistician who helped to pioneer the use of statistics in epidemiology. With Seymour Geisser, he developed the Greenhouse–Geisser correction, which is now widely used in the analysis of variance to correct for violations of the assumption of compound symmetry.

== Academic career ==
Greenhouse was one of several founding statisticians at the National Institutes of Health (NIH), where, with Jerome Cornfield, Jacob Lieberman, Nathan Mantel, and Marvin Schneiderman, he co-founded the first biometry group in the National Cancer Institute in 1948. In 1954, Greenhouse became head of the theoretical statistics and applied mathematics section at the National Institute of Mental Health. He became chief of the National Institute of Child Health and Human Development's epidemiology and biometry branch in 1966, and continued to work there until 1974, when he joined the faculty of George Washington University (GWU). He chaired the GWU department of statistics twice: in 1976–1979 and in 1985–1986. He retired from the GWU faculty in 1988, whereupon he was named an emeritus professor there.

== Honors and awards ==
Greenhouse was a fellow of the American Statistical Association, the Institute of Mathematical Statistics, the American Association for the Advancement of Science, and the Royal Statistical Society. He was also an elected member of the International Statistical Institute, a fellow of the American College of Epidemiology, and a fellow of the American Heart Association's Council of Epidemiology. In 1993 Greenhouse was awarded the American Statistical Association Founders Award.
