= Hugh Gravelle =

Professor Hugh Stanley Emrys Gravelle studied at the University of Leeds (September 1963 – June 1966), where he graduated in BComm. He joined the staff at Queen Mary College, University of London, lecturing in theories and applied microeconomics. He then moved to the University of York, Centre for Health Economics in January 1998 to present.

Most economists probably know him as the lead author with Ray Rees, of the standard intermediate text: Microeconomics, Prentice Hall, 1981, First Edition. He started this text while at Queen Mary College as lecture notes, where he was teaching Microeconomics based on James Ferguson text. The book was intended and received as a bridge between standard and more advanced text, presenting the standard neoclassical point of view, but with a view toward General Equilibrium Analysis and Welfare Economics. In the Preface of the third edition in 2004, the authors hinted that a new edition seems warranted every eleven years of so, which one cannot avoid linking to sunspot-cycles which peaks at that interval.

An application of Gravelle et al. welfare theorem is exemplified in market failure. Since 1998, Gravelle has published enormously in the field of Health Economics. Wikipedia has highlighted one of his collaborative inputs in its entry in pay for performance (healthcare).

One of Professor Gravelle's theory of health and unemployment was discussed in a recent book by Davide Stucker and Sanjay Basu. The theory holds that sickness is not caused by unemployment but the reverse, namely, unemployment is a result of sickness (2013, p. 187).
