= Greenhouse–Geisser correction =

Correction for lack of sphericity

The Greenhouse–Geisser correction $\widehat{\varepsilon}$ is a statistical method of adjusting for lack of sphericity in a repeated measures ANOVA. The correction functions as both an estimate of epsilon (sphericity) and a correction for lack of sphericity. The correction was proposed by Samuel Greenhouse and Seymour Geisser in 1959.

The Greenhouse–Geisser correction is an estimate of sphericity ($\widehat{\varepsilon}$). If sphericity is met, then $\varepsilon = 1$. If sphericity is not met, then epsilon will be less than 1 (and the degrees of freedom will be overestimated and the F-value will be inflated). To correct for this inflation, multiply the Greenhouse–Geisser estimate of epsilon to the degrees of freedom used to calculate the F critical value.

An alternative correction that is believed to be less conservative is the Huynh–Feldt correction (1976). As a general rule of thumb, the Greenhouse–Geisser correction is the preferred correction method when the epsilon estimate is below 0.75. Otherwise, the Huynh–Feldt correction is preferred.

== See also ==
- Mauchly's sphericity test
- Multivariate analysis of variance (MANOVA)
