= Multi-level regression =

Multi-level regression can refer to:

- Multi-level modelling in general
- more specifically, to Multilevel regression with poststratification
