= Opinion polling for the 2017 German federal election =

In the run up to the 2017 German federal election, various organisations carry out opinion polling to gauge voting intention in Germany. Results of such polls are displayed in this article.

The date range for these opinion polls are from the previous general election, held on 22 September 2013, to the present day. The next general election is scheduled to be held on 24 September 2017.

== Graphical summary ==
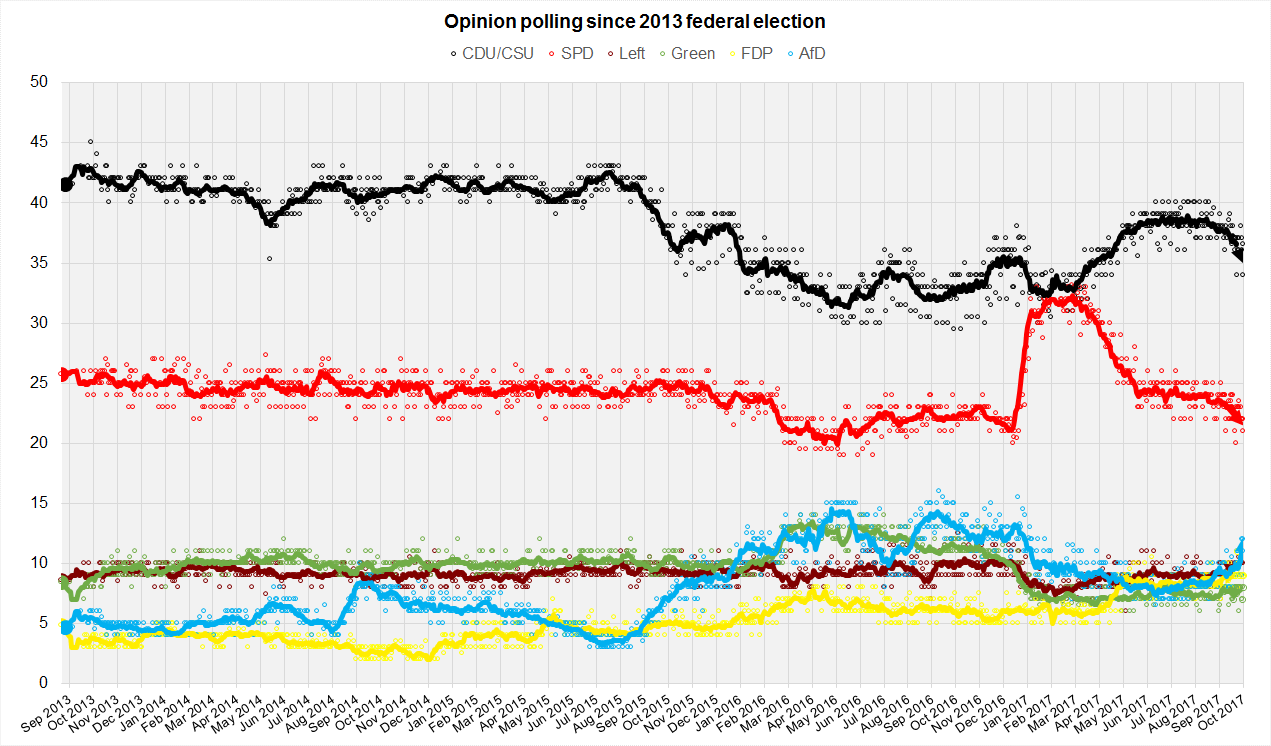

The polls are from September 2013 (the last federal election) up to the current date. Each colored line represents a political party.

== Poll results ==
Individual poll results are listed in the table below in reverse chronological order, showing the most recent first, and using the date the survey's fieldwork was done, as opposed to the date of publication. If such date is unknown, the date of publication is given instead. The highest percentage figure in each polling survey is displayed with its background shaded in the leading party's colour. In the instance of a tie, the figures with the highest percentages are shaded. The lead column on the right shows the percentage-point difference between the two parties with the highest figures.

=== 2017 ===
Polling firm	Fieldwork date	Sample size	Abs.	Union	SPD	Linke	Grüne	FDP	AfD	Others	Lead
2017 federal election	24 Sep 2017	—N/a	23.8	32.9	20.5	9.2	8.9	10.7	12.6	5.2	12.4
INSA	21–22 Sep 2017	2,000	–	34	21	11	8	9	13	4	13
Forschungsgruppe Wahlen	20–21 Sep 2017	1,725	–	36	21.5	8.5	8	10	11	5	14.5
Forsa	18–21 Sep 2017	2,006	–	36	22	9.5	7	9.5	11	5	14
Emnid	14–21 Sep 2017	1,994	–	35	22	10	8	9	11	5	13
GMS	14–20 Sep 2017	1,004	–	37	22	9	8	9	10	5	15
YouGov	15–19 Sep 2017	1,862	–	36	23	10	7	9	10	5	13
INSA	15–18 Sep 2017	2,042	–	36	22	11	7	9	11	4	14
Forsa	11–15 Sep 2017	2,501	–	36	23	10	8	9	9	5	13
Forschungsgruppe Wahlen	12–14 Sep 2017	1,383	–	36	23	9	8	10	10	4	13
Allensbach	6–14 Sep 2017	1,083	–	36.5	22	9	8	11	10	3.5	14.5
Infratest dimap	12–13 Sep 2017	1,503	–	37	20	9	7.5	9.5	12	5	17
Emnid	7–13 Sep 2017	1,888	–	36	22	10	8	9	11	4	14
Trend Research	10–12 Sep 2017	1,042	–	36	22	10	7	9	11	4	14
YouGov	8–12 Sep 2017	1,600	–	36	23	10	8	9	10	4	13
INSA	8–11 Sep 2017	2,054	–	36.5	23.5	10.5	6	9	11	3.5	13
Forsa	4–8 Sep 2017	2,505	26	37	23	10	8	8	9	5	14
Forschungsgruppe Wahlen	5–7 Sep 2017	1,378	–	38	22	9	8	9	9	5	16
Forsa	4–7 Sep 2017	2,001	–	37	23	10	8	9	9	4	14
Infratest dimap	4–6 Sep 2017	1,503	–	37	21	10	8	9	11	4	16
YouGov	4–6 Sep 2017	1,617	–	34	24	9	7	9	11	6	10
Trend Research	3–6 Sep 2017	1,045	–	37	24	10	7	8	10	5	13
Emnid	31 Aug–6 Sep 2017	1,869	–	37	24	9	8	8	9	5	13
GMS	31 Aug–6 Sep 2017	1,012	–	38	22	9	9	10	8	4	16
INSA	1–4 Sep 2017	2,048	–	36.5	23.5	10	6.5	8.5	10.5	4.5	13
Forsa	28 Aug–1 Sep 2017	2,503	28	38	23	9	8	8	9	5	15
Forschungsgruppe Wahlen	29–31 Aug 2017	1,309	–	39	22	9	8	10	8	4	17
Allensbach	22–31 Aug 2017	1,043	–	38.5	24	8	7.5	10	8	4	14.5
Infratest dimap	28–30 Aug 2017	1,411	–	37	23	9	8	8	11	4	14
Emnid	24–30 Aug 2017	1,889	–	38	24	9	8	8	8	5	14
YouGov	25–29 Aug 2017	1,557	–	36	25	10	7	7	10	5	11
INSA	25–28 Aug 2017	2,034	–	37	24	10	6.5	8	10	4.5	13
Trend Research	24–28 Aug 2017	1,049	–	38	23	9	6	9	10	5	15
Forsa	21–25 Aug 2017	2,501	26	38	24	9	7	8	9	5	14
Forschungsgruppe Wahlen	22–24 Aug 2017	1,283	–	39	22	9	8	9	9	4	17
Infratest dimap	22–23 Aug 2017	1,035	–	38	22	9	8	9	10	4	16
Emnid	17–23 Aug 2017	1,979	–	38	23	9	7	9	8	6	15
YouGov	18–22 Aug 2017	1,520	–	37	25	9	7	8	9	5	12
Forsa	14–18 Aug 2017	2,501	24	38	24	9	7	8	9	5	14
Allensbach	4–17 Aug 2017	1,421	–	39.5	24	8	7.5	10	7	4	15.5
INSA	18–21 Aug 2017	2,036	–	38	24	9	7	9	10	3	14
Emnid	10–16 Aug 2017	1,426	–	39	24	9	8	8	7	5	15
YouGov	11–15 Aug 2017	1,538	–	37	25	9	7	9	9	4	12
GMS	8–15 Aug 2017	1,007	–	40	22	8	8	9	7	6	18
INSA	11–14 Aug 2017	2,025	–	37	25	9	7	9	10	3	12
Forsa	7–11 Aug 2017	2,507	26	39	23	9	8	8	8	5	16
Forschungsgruppe Wahlen	8–10 Aug 2017	1,277	–	40	24	8	8	8	8	4	16
Emnid	3–9 Aug 2017	1,886	–	38	24	10	7	8	8	5	14
YouGov	4–8 Aug 2017	1,513	–	38	24	9	6	9	9	5	14
Infratest dimap	4–8 Aug 2017	1,505	–	39	24	9	8	8	8	4	15
INSA	4–7 Aug 2017	2,046	–	37	25	10.5	6.5	9	9	3	12
Forsa	31 Jul–4 Aug 2017	2,503	24	40	23	8	8	7	8	6	17
Emnid	27 Jul–2 Aug 2017	2,453	–	38	23	10	8	8	8	5	15
YouGov	28 Jul–1 Aug 2017	2,000	–	37	25	9	7	9	8	5	12
INSA	28–31 Jul 2017	2,046	–	37	24.5	10	7	9	9.5	3	12.5
Forsa	24–28 Jul 2017	2,501	23	40	22	8	8	8	8	6	18
Infratest dimap	25–26 Jul 2017	1,004	–	40	23	8	8	8	9	4	17
Emnid	20–26 Jul 2017	1,921	–	38	24	9	8	8	9	4	14
YouGov	21–25 Jul 2017	2,000	–	38	25	9	7	9	8	4	13
INSA	21–24 Jul 2017	2,009	–	37.5	25	10.5	6.5	8.5	9	3	12.5
Forsa	17–21 Jul 2017	2,507	23	40	22	9	8	8	7	6	18
Forschungsgruppe Wahlen	18–20 Jul 2017	1,277	–	40	24	8	8	8	8	4	16
Emnid	13–19 Jul 2017	2,349	–	38	25	9	8	8	8	4	13
INSA	14–17 Jul 2017	2,026	–	36	25	9.5	6.5	8.5	10	4.5	11
Forsa	10–14 Jul 2017	2,502	23	40	22	9	8	8	7	6	18
YouGov	10–12 Jul 2017	1,535	–	38	24	9	8	9	8	4	14
Emnid	6–12 Jul 2017	1,263	–	38	25	9	8	7	8	5	13
Allensbach	1–12 Jul 2017	1,403	–	39.5	25	9	7	9	7	3.5	14.5
Ipsos	7–11 Jul 2017	1,047	–	39	26	8	7	8	8	4	13
INSA	7–10 Jul 2017	2,009	–	36	25	9.5	6.5	9	9.5	4.5	11
Forsa	3–7 Jul 2017	2,501	22	39	22	9	8	8	8	6	17
Forschungsgruppe Wahlen	4–6 Jul 2017	1,321	–	40	24	9	8	8	7	4	16
Infratest dimap	3–5 Jul 2017	1,500	–	39	23	9	8	9	9	3	16
Emnid	30 Jun–5 Jul 2017	1,878	–	38	25	9	8	8	7	5	13
GMS	29 Jun–5 Jul 2017	1,009	–	39	23	8	9	9	7	5	16
INSA	30 Jun–3 Jul 2017	2,044	–	36.5	25	10.5	6.5	9	9	3.5	11.5
Forsa	26–30 Jun 2017	2,503	21	39	23	9	8	8	7	6	16
Forsa	26–28 Jun 2017	1,507	–	40	23	9	9	8	7	4	17
YouGov	26–28 Jun 2017	2,000	–	38	25	9	8	8	8	4	13
Ipsos	23–26 Jun 2017	1,052	–	39	25	8	7	8	9	4	14
INSA	23–26 Jun 2017	2,056	–	37	26	10	6.5	9	8.5	3	11
Emnid	22–24 Jun 2017	936	–	39	24	9	8	8	7	5	15
Forsa	19–23 Jun 2017	2,502	22	40	23	9	9	7	7	5	17
Forschungsgruppe Wahlen	20–22 Jun 2017	1,261	–	39	25	9	8	8	7	4	14
YouGov	19–22 Jun 2017	1,523	–	36	25	10	8	9	7	5	11
Emnid	16–21 Jun 2017	1,363	–	39	24	9	8	7	8	5	15
INSA	16–19 Jun 2017	2,037	–	36.5	25	11	6.5	9	9	3	11.5
Forsa	12–16 Jun 2017	2,505	23	39	23	10	8	8	7	5	16
Allensbach	1–15 Jun 2017	1,437	–	40	24	8.5	7	10.5	6.5	3.5	16
Emnid	8–13 Jun 2017	2,054	–	39	25	9	7	7	8	5	14
Infratest dimap	12–13 Jun 2017	1,018	–	39	24	8	7	9	8	5	15
Ipsos	9–12 Jun 2017	1,054	–	38	26	8	7	7	9	4	12
INSA	9–12 Jun 2017	2,037	–	37.5	23.5	11	6.5	9	9	3.5	14
Forsa	6–9 Jun 2017	2,004	21	38	24	8	8	9	7	6	14
Infratest dimap	6–7 Jun 2017	1,503	–	38	24	8	7	10	9	4	14
Emnid	1–7 Jun 2017	1,398	–	39	25	9	8	7	8	4	14
INSA	2–6 Jun 2017	2,037	–	38	23	11	7	9	8	4	15
Forsa	29 May–2 Jun 2017	2,501	20	39	24	8	8	8	7	6	15
Forschungsgruppe Wahlen	30 May–1 Jun 2017	1,301	–	39	25	9	7	8	8	4	14
YouGov	29–31 May 2017	2,040	–	37	23	10	8	9	9	4	14
GMS	26–31 May 2017	1,016	–	39	23	8	8	10	8	4	16
Emnid	24–31 May 2017	1,838	–	38	27	8	7	7	8	5	11
Ipsos	26–29 May 2017	1,093	–	38	28	8	7	7	8	4	10
INSA	26–29 May 2017	2,053	–	35.5	26	10	6	10	9	3.5	9.5
Forsa	22–26 May 2017	2,001	20	38	25	8	7	9	7	6	13
Emnid	18–23 May 2017	1,703	–	38	25	8	8	8	8	5	13
INSA	19–22 May 2017	2,042	–	36.5	26	10	6	9.5	8	4	10.5
Forsa	15–19 May 2017	2,502	22	39	25	8	7	9	7	5	14
Allensbach	5–19 May 2017	1,457	–	37	26	8	8	9	8	4	11
Forschungsgruppe Wahlen	16–18 May 2017	1,344	–	38	27	9	7	8	7	4	11
Infratest dimap	16–17 May 2017	1,017	–	38	26	6	8	9	9	4	12
YouGov	15–17 May 2017	2,000	–	38	25	9	7	9	9	3	13
Emnid	11–17 May 2017	2,413	–	38	26	9	7	7	8	5	12
INSA	12–15 May 2017	2,037	–	36	27	9	6	8	10	4	9
Ipsos	12–14 May 2017	1,049	–	37	29	8	7	6	8	5	8
Forsa	8–12 May 2017	2,506	24	38	26	8	7	8	7	6	12
YouGov	8–11 May 2017	2,010	–	37	25	8	7	9	9	5	12
Infratest dimap	8–10 May 2017	1,500	–	37	27	7	8	8	10	3	10
Emnid	4–10 May 2017	1,837	–	37	27	10	8	6	8	4	10
INSA	5–8 May 2017	2,067	–	35	27	10	7	7	10	4	8
Forsa	2–5 May 2017	2,004	23	36	29	8	7	7	7	6	7
GMS	30 Apr–3 May 2017	1,004	–	36	29	8	7	7	9	4	7
Emnid	27 Apr–3 May 2017	1,935	–	36	28	9	7	6	9	5	8
Ipsos	28 Apr–2 May 2017	1,059	–	36	30	8	7	5	9	5	6
INSA	28 Apr–2 May 2017	2,035	–	34	28.5	10.5	6.5	7	9	4.5	5.5
YouGov	27 Apr–2 May 2017	1,957	–	35	28	9	7	7	9	5	7
Forsa	24–28 Apr 2017	2,502	23	36	28	8	8	7	8	5	8
Forschungsgruppe Wahlen	25–27 Apr 2017	1,328	–	37	29	9	8	6	8	3	8
Emnid	20–26 Apr 2017	2,439	–	36	29	9	7	6	9	4	7
INSA	21–24 Apr 2017	2,041	–	34	30	9.5	6.5	6.5	10	3.5	4
Forsa	18–21 Apr 2017	2,002	24	36	30	8	7	6	9	4	6
Infratest dimap	18–19 Apr 2017	934	–	35	30	8	7	6	10	4	5
Emnid	13–19 Apr 2017	1,412	–	36	31	9	6	5	9	4	5
INSA	14–18 Apr 2017	2,038	–	34	30.5	9	6	6.5	10	4	3.5
Ipsos	13–18 Apr 2017	1,056	–	35	30	8	7	5	10	5	5
Forsa	10–13 Apr 2017	2,007	25	36	30	9	6	6	8	5	6
Allensbach	1–13 Apr 2017	1,407	–	36	31	9	7	6	7	4	5
Infratest dimap	10–12 Apr 2017	1,502	–	34	31	7	8	6	11	3	3
Emnid	6–12 Apr 2017	2,436	–	35	31	9	7	6	9	3	4
INSA	7–10 Apr 2017	2,030	–	33	31.5	8.5	6.5	6.5	10	4	1.5
Civey	4–10 Apr 2017	7,544	–	35.1	30.1	8.6	7.0	5.8	9.0	4.4	5.0
Forsa	3–7 Apr 2017	2,502	23	36	30	8	7	6	8	5	6
Forschungsgruppe Wahlen	4–6 Apr 2017	1,384	–	35	32	8	7	5	9	4	3
Emnid	30 Mar–5 Apr 2017	1,958	–	35	33	8	7	5	9	3	2
INSA	31 Mar–3 Apr 2017	2,033	–	32	32.5	9	6.5	6.5	9	4.5	0.5
Ipsos	31 Mar–3 Apr 2017	1,046	–	34	30	8	8	5	10	5	4
Civey	30 Mar–3 Apr 2017	7,544	–	34.3	31.9	7.9	6.8	6.5	8.2	4.4	2.4
Forsa	27–31 Mar 2017	2,504	24	36	29	9	7	5	8	6	7
Emnid	23–29 Mar 2017	2,416	–	33	33	8	7	6	8	5	Tie
INSA	24–27 Mar 2017	2,034	–	32	32	8.5	6.5	6	11	4	Tie
Civey	21–27 Mar 2017	7,524	–	32.8	32.5	7.1	6.9	6.2	10.0	4.5	0.3
Forsa	20–24 Mar 2017	2,501	23	34	32	8	7	6	7	6	2
Infratest dimap	20–22 Mar 2017	1,023	–	32	32	7	8	6	11	4	Tie
Emnid	16–22 Mar 2017	2,450	–	33	33	8	8	5	9	4	Tie
GMS	16–22 Mar 2017	1,008	–	34	31	8	8	6	9	4	3
Civey	19–21 Mar 2017	5,030	–	32.2	33.1	7.6	6.7	6.1	10.0	4.3	0.9
Ipsos	17–20 Mar 2017	1,055	–	33	30	8	8	6	11	4	3
INSA	17–20 Mar 2017	1,933	–	31	32	8.5	6.5	6.5	11.5	4	1
Allensbach	6–19 Mar 2017	1,397	–	34	33	8	7.5	6.5	7	4	1
Forsa	13–17 Mar 2017	2,504	23	34	31	7	7	6	9	6	3
Emnid	9–15 Mar 2017	1,832	–	33	32	8	8	5	9	5	1
INSA	10–13 Mar 2017	2,051	–	31	31	8.5	6.5	7	11.5	4.5	Tie
Civey	8–10 Mar 2017	5,017	–	33.5	31.4	7.1	6.8	6.7	10.3	4.2	2.1
Forsa	6–10 Mar 2017	2,505	24	33	32	7	7	6	9	6	1
Forschungsgruppe Wahlen	7–9 Mar 2017	1,212	–	34	32	8	7	5	9	5	2
Infratest dimap	6–8 Mar 2017	1,502	–	32	31	8	8	6	11	4	1
Emnid	2–8 Mar 2017	1,882	–	33	33	8	7	6	8	5	Tie
INSA	3–6 Mar 2017	2,022	–	30.5	31.5	8.5	6.5	7.5	11	4.5	1
Ipsos	3–6 Mar 2017	1,058	–	33	29	9	8	6	11	4	4
Civey	2–6 Mar 2017	5,006	–	33.6	31.2	7.6	6.7	7.0	9.4	4.5	2.4
Forsa	27 Feb–3 Mar 2017	2,502	23	33	32	7	8	6	8	6	1
Emnid	23 Feb–1 Mar 2017	1,403	–	33	32	8	7	6	10	4	1
Civey	26–27 Feb 2017	5,012	–	34.3	31.4	8.1	7.1	6.4	8.4	4.3	2.9
INSA	24–27 Feb 2017	2,004	–	30.5	32	8	6.5	7	11	5	1.5
Forsa	20–24 Feb 2017	2,500	23	33	31	7	8	7	9	5	2
Infratest dimap	20–22 Feb 2017	1,047	–	31	32	7	8	6	11	5	1
Emnid	16–22 Feb 2017	1,880	–	32	32	8	7	7	9	5	Tie
Civey	18–20 Feb 2017	5,011	–	34.1	28.7	8.4	7.9	6.5	10.0	4.4	5.4
Ipsos	17–20 Feb 2017	1,045	–	32	30	10	7	5	12	4	2
INSA	17–20 Feb 2017	2,030	–	31.5	30	9.5	6.5	5.5	11	6	1.5
Forsa	13–17 Feb 2017	2,502	23	34	31	8	7	6	8	6	3
Forschungsgruppe Wahlen	14–16 Feb 2017	1,231	–	34	30	7	9	6	10	4	4
Emnid	9–15 Feb 2017	1,885	–	32	33	8	7	6	9	5	1
Allensbach	1–15 Feb 2017	1,542	–	33	30.5	8	8	7	8.5	5	2.5
INSA	10–13 Feb 2017	2,028	–	30	31	10	7	5	12	5	1
Civey	7–13 Feb 2017	5,016	–	33.1	29.3	8.3	7.7	6.2	11.0	4.4	3.8
Forsa	5–10 Feb 2017	2,502	24	34	31	8	7	5	9	6	3
Emnid	2–8 Feb 2017	1,966	–	33	32	8	7	6	10	4	1
GMS	2–8 Feb 2017	1,009	–	33	29	8	9	6	11	4	4
Civey	2–7 Feb 2017	5,025	–	34.0	27.2	8.5	8.3	6.4	11.3	4.3	6.8
INSA	3–6 Feb 2017	2,042	–	30	31	10	7	6	12	4	1
Trend Research	31 Jan–6 Feb 2017	854	–	30	30	9	7	6	13	5	Tie
Ipsos	3–5 Feb 2017	1,046	–	33	29	9	8	5	12	4	4
Forsa	30 Jan–3 Feb 2017	2,501	23	34	31	8	8	5	10	4	3
Emnid	26 Jan–2 Feb 2017	2,233	–	33	29	8	8	6	11	5	4
INSA	31 Jan–1 Feb 2017	1,003	–	33	27	9	9	6	12	4	6
Infratest dimap	30 Jan–1 Feb 2017	1,506	–	34	28	8	8	6	12	4	6
INSA	27–30 Jan 2017	2,088	–	32.5	26	10.5	7.5	6.5	13	4	6.5
Civey	22–30 Jan 2017	5,014	–	36.2	23.1	9.1	8.6	6.4	12.1	4.5	13.1
Forsa	23–27 Jan 2017	2,502	24	35	26	9	8	6	11	5	9
Forschungsgruppe Wahlen	24–26 Jan 2017	1,303	–	36	24	10	8	6	11	5	12
Infratest dimap	24–25 Jan 2017	1,029	–	35	23	8	9	6	14	5	12
Emnid	19–25 Jan 2017	1,996	–	37	23	10	10	6	11	3	14
INSA	20–23 Jan 2017	1,992	–	32.5	21	11	8.5	7.5	14.5	5	11.5
Ipsos	19–23 Jan 2017	1,046	–	34	23	10	11	5	13	4	11
Civey	12–23 Jan 2017	5,028	–	37.1	20.4	9.5	9.3	6.2	13.2	4.3	16.7
Forsa	16–20 Jan 2017	2,504	26	37	21	9	10	6	12	5	16
Allensbach	5–19 Jan 2017	1,441	–	36	23	9.5	9	7	11.5	4	13
Emnid	12–18 Jan 2017	2,805	–	36	21	11	9	6	12	5	15
INSA	13–16 Jan 2017	2,031	–	33.5	21	11	8.5	7.5	13.5	5	12.5
Civey	9–16 Jan 2017	5,014	–	36.1	20.5	9.4	9.9	6.4	13.3	4.4	15.6
Forsa	9–13 Jan 2017	2,503	26	38	21	9	9	6	11	6	17
Forschungsgruppe Wahlen	10–12 Jan 2017	1,292	–	36	21	9	10	6	13	5	15
Emnid	6–11 Jan 2017	1,878	–	37	21	10	10	6	12	4	16
Ipsos	6–9 Jan 2017	1,054	–	34	22	10	10	5	14	5	12
INSA	6–9 Jan 2017	2,054	–	32	21	11	9	7	15	5	11
Forsa	2–6 Jan 2017	2,501	27	37	20	9	10	6	12	6	17
Emnid	3–5 Jan 2017	834	–	38	22	9	10	5	12	4	15
Infratest dimap	2–4 Jan 2017	1,505	–	37	20	9	9	5	15	5	17
GMS	28 Dec 2016–4 Jan 2017	1,006	–	36	20	10	10	7	13	4	16
INSA	30 Dec 2016–2 Jan 2017	2,099	–	32	21	11.5	10	6	15	4.5	11

=== 2016 ===
Polling firm	Fieldwork date	Sample size	Abs.	Union	SPD	Linke	Grüne	FDP	AfD	Others	Lead
Forsa	27–30 Dec 2016	2,001	30	37	21	9	10	6	12	5	16
INSA	21–23 Dec 2016	2,083	–	31.5	20.5	11.5	10	6	15.5	5	11
Forsa	19–23 Dec 2016	2,504	27	38	20	9	10	5	12	6	18
Emnid	15–21 Dec 2016	2,326	–	36	21	10	10	6	13	4	15
Ipsos	16–20 Dec 2016	1,045	–	33	22	11	10	6	13	5	11
INSA	16–19 Dec 2016	2,116	–	33	21.5	11.5	10	6.5	13	4.5	11.5
Forsa	12–16 Dec 2016	2,502	26	36	22	9	10	6	11	6	14
Allensbach	1–15 Dec 2016	1,459	–	35.5	22	9.5	10	7.5	10.5	5	13.5
Emnid	8–14 Dec 2016	2,411	–	36	22	10	11	5	12	4	14
Infratest dimap	12–14 Dec 2016	1,005	–	36	21	9	10	6	13	5	15
INSA	9–12 Dec 2016	1,455	–	32	21.5	12	11.5	5.5	13	4.5	10.5
Forsa	5–9 Dec 2016	2,506	26	37	21	9	10	6	11	6	16
Forschungsgruppe Wahlen	6–8 Dec 2016	1,234	–	36	22	10	10	5	12	5	14
Emnid	1–7 Dec 2016	2,426	–	36	22	10	10	5	13	4	14
Infratest dimap	5–7 Dec 2016	1,504	–	35	22	9	11	5	13	5	13
Ipsos	2–6 Dec 2016	1,054	–	34	22	10	11	6	13	4	12
INSA	2–5 Dec 2016	2,080	–	32	22.5	11.5	10.5	5	14	4.5	9.5
Forsa	28 Nov–2 Dec 2016	2,501	25	36	22	10	11	6	10	5	14
Emnid	24–30 Nov 2016	2,658	–	37	22	10	11	5	12	3	15
INSA	25–28 Nov 2016	2,097	–	32.5	22	11.5	10	5.5	13.5	5	10.5
Forsa	21–25 Nov 2016	2,503	26	37	22	9	10	5	11	6	15
Forschungsgruppe Wahlen	22–24 Nov 2016	1,258	–	36	21	10	11	5	13	4	15
Emnid	17–23 Nov 2016	2,426	–	35	23	9	11	5	12	5	12
INSA	18–21 Nov 2016	2,030	–	31.5	22	10.5	10.5	5.5	15	5	9.5
Ipsos	18–21 Nov 2016	1,042	–	33	23	9	11	6	14	4	10
Forsa	14–18 Nov 2016	2,505	25	36	23	10	10	5	10	6	13
Infratest dimap	14–16 Nov 2016	1,014	–	32	23	9	13	6	12	5	9
Emnid	10–16 Nov 2016	2,859	–	33	24	9	12	5	13	4	9
INSA	11–14 Nov 2016	2,037	–	30	22.5	11.5	10.5	6.5	14.5	4.5	7.5
Forsa	7–11 Nov 2016	2,503	26	35	23	10	11	6	10	5	12
Allensbach	28 Oct–10 Nov 2016	1,436	–	34	23	9	11	7.5	10.5	5	11
Forschungsgruppe Wahlen	8–10 Nov 2016	1,276	–	34	22	10	13	5	12	4	12
Emnid	3–9 Nov 2016	2,782	–	34	23	10	11	5	12	5	11
Ipsos	4–8 Nov 2016	1,044	–	33	23	9	11	6	13	5	10
INSA	4–7 Nov 2016	2,045	–	30.5	22	10.5	11	7	13.5	5.5	8.5
Forsa	31 Oct–4 Nov 2016	2,503	26	34	23	10	11	6	11	5	11
Emnid	27 Oct–2 Nov 2016	1,678	–	34	22	10	11	5	12	6	12
GMS	27 Oct–2 Nov 2016	1,012	–	33	22	11	11	7	12	4	11
Infratest dimap	31 Oct–2 Nov 2016	1,505	–	33	22	9	12	6	13	5	11
INSA	28 Oct–2 Nov 2016	2,037	–	30.5	22.5	11.5	11	6.5	13	5	8
Forsa	24–28 Oct 2016	2,503	26	34	22	10	11	7	11	5	12
Forschungsgruppe Wahlen	25–27 Oct 2016	1,287	–	33	23	10	12	5	12	5	10
Emnid	20–26 Oct 2016	1,840	–	34	23	10	11	5	12	5	11
INSA	21–24 Oct 2016	2,043	–	30.5	22.5	11.5	11.5	6	14	4	8
Ipsos	21–24 Oct 2016	1,046	–	33	22	9	11	6	14	5	11
Forsa	17–21 Oct 2016	2,504	29	35	22	9	11	6	12	5	13
Emnid	13–19 Oct 2016	1,961	–	33	23	10	11	5	13	5	10
Infratest dimap	18–19 Oct 2016	1,018	–	33	22	9	12	5	14	5	11
INSA	14–17 Oct 2016	2,077	–	29.5	21.5	12.5	12	6.5	13.5	4.5	8
Forsa	10–14 Oct 2016	2,505	31	34	22	9	11	6	12	6	12
Allensbach	1–13 Oct 2016	1,458	–	33	22	9	12	7.5	12.5	4	11
Forschungsgruppe Wahlen	11–13 Oct 2016	1,188	–	34	22	10	12	5	13	4	12
Emnid	6–12 Oct 2016	2,827	–	32	24	9	11	6	13	5	8
GMS	7–12 Oct 2016	1,003	–	34	21	10	12	7	13	3	13
INSA	7–10 Oct 2016	2,085	–	29.5	22	12	11	6.5	15	4	7.5
Ipsos	7–10 Oct 2016	1,050	–	33	22	9	11	6	15	4	11
Forsa	4–7 Oct 2016	2,004	28	34	22	10	11	6	12	5	12
Emnid	29 Sep–5 Oct 2016	1,866	–	32	23	10	12	6	12	5	9
Infratest dimap	4–5 Oct 2016	1,503	–	33	22	9	11	6	14	5	11
INSA	30 Sep–3 Oct 2016	2,049	–	30	21	11.5	11.5	7	15	4	9
Forsa	26–30 Sep 2016	2,503	28	33	22	10	11	6	13	5	11
Ipsos	23–29 Sep 2016	1,043	–	33	22	9	10	6	15	5	11
Emnid	22–28 Sep 2016	1,939	–	32	23	10	11	7	12	5	9
INSA	23–26 Sep 2016	2,048	–	30	21	11	10	7	15.5	5.5	9
Forsa	19–23 Sep 2016	2,506	25	33	23	9	10	6	14	5	10
Forschungsgruppe Wahlen	20–22 Sep 2016	1,241	–	33	22	10	13	5	13	4	11
Emnid	15–21 Sep 2016	2,798	–	32	23	9	11	6	14	5	9
Infratest dimap	19–21 Sep 2016	1,018	–	32	22	8	12	6	16	4	10
INSA	16–19 Sep 2016	2,069	–	30	22	10	11	7	15	5	8
Forsa	12–16 Sep 2016	2,504	26	33	23	8	11	6	13	6	10
Allensbach	3–15 Sep 2016	1,407	–	33.5	24	7	11	7	12.5	5	9.5
Emnid	8–14 Sep 2016	2,780	–	32	24	9	11	5	14	5	8
GMS	9–14 Sep 2016	1,010	–	33	23	8	11	7	13	5	10
Ipsos	9–13 Sep 2016	1,060	–	32	22	9	11	6	15	5	10
INSA	9–12 Sep 2016	2,035	–	30.5	21.5	10	11	7	15	5	9
Forsa	5–9 Sep 2016	2,501	28	32	23	8	11	6	13	7	9
Emnid	1–7 Sep 2016	2,423	–	33	23	9	11	6	13	5	10
INSA	2–5 Sep 2016	2,071	–	30.5	21.5	9.5	11.5	6.5	15	5.5	9
Forsa	29 Aug–2 Sep 2016	2,501	28	33	22	8	12	7	12	6	11
Ipsos	26 Aug–2 Sep 2016	1,063	–	32	22	10	12	7	13	4	10
Emnid	25–31 Aug 2016	1,966	–	34	23	9	11	6	12	5	11
Infratest dimap	29–31 Aug 2016	1,504	–	33	23	9	11	5	14	5	10
INSA	26–29 Aug 2016	2,013	–	30.5	21	10.5	11.5	7	14.5	5	9.5
Forsa	22–26 Aug 2016	2,503	29	33	22	9	12	6	12	6	11
Emnid	18–24 Aug 2016	1,981	–	34	22	10	12	5	11	6	12
Infratest dimap	23–24 Aug 2016	1,008	–	33	22	9	12	5	13	6	11
INSA	19–22 Aug 2016	2,020	–	31	21	10.5	11.5	6.5	14	5.5	10
Forsa	15–19 Aug 2016	2,504	29	35	22	9	12	6	10	6	13
Allensbach	3–17 Aug 2016	1,496	–	34.5	23	9	11.5	7.5	10	4.5	11.5
Emnid	11–17 Aug 2016	2,358	–	34	23	9	13	5	10	6	11
INSA	12–15 Aug 2016	2,046	–	31	20.5	11.5	11	7	13.5	5.5	10.5
Forsa	8–12 Aug 2016	2,501	29	36	21	9	13	6	9	6	15
Forschungsgruppe Wahlen	9–11 Aug 2016	1,221	–	35	22	9	13	6	11	4	13
Emnid	4–10 Aug 2016	2,352	–	34	22	10	12	6	11	5	12
INSA	5–8 Aug 2016	2,056	–	31.5	21	11.5	11.5	6.5	13	5	10.5
Forsa	1–5 Aug 2016	2,501	28	36	21	10	13	5	9	6	15
Emnid	28 Jul–3 Aug 2016	2,815	–	34	22	10	12	6	11	5	12
Infratest dimap	1–3 Aug 2016	1,503	–	34	22	9	13	5	12	5	12
INSA	30 Jul–1 Aug 2016	1,973	–	31.5	21	11	11	6.5	13	6	10.5
Forsa	25–29 Jul 2016	2,508	27	35	23	9	12	6	9	6	12
Emnid	21–27 Jul 2016	2,815	–	35	23	9	11	5	12	5	12
INSA	22–25 Jul 2016	2,049	–	31.5	21.5	11.5	12	6.5	12	5	10
Forsa	18–22 Jul 2016	2,508	28	35	22	9	13	6	9	6	13
Forschungsgruppe Wahlen	19–21 Jul 2016	1,271	–	35	24	8	13	5	11	4	11
Emnid	14–20 Jul 2016	1,870	–	35	23	10	12	5	10	5	12
INSA	15–18 Jul 2016	2,038	–	32	21	11.5	12	7	11	5.5	11
Forsa	11–15 Jul 2016	2,502	28	35	22	9	12	7	9	6	13
Allensbach	1–14 Jul 2016	1,466	–	35.5	22.5	9.5	12	7	9.5	4	13
Emnid	7–13 Jul 2016	1,973	–	35	24	9	12	5	10	5	11
GMS	8–13 Jul 2016	1,005	–	34	22	9	13	7	9	6	12
Infratest dimap	12–13 Jul 2016	1,037	–	33	22	8	14	6	12	5	11
INSA	8–11 Jul 2016	2,034	–	31	20.5	11	12	7.5	12.5	5.5	10.5
Forsa	4–8 Jul 2016	2,503	27	36	23	9	12	6	8	6	13
Forschungsgruppe Wahlen	4–7 Jul 2016	1,320	–	34	23	9	13	6	11	4	11
Emnid	2–6 Jul 2016	1,402	–	35	23	9	13	5	10	5	12
Infratest dimap	4–6 Jul 2016	1,504	–	34	22	9	13	6	12	4	12
INSA	1–4 Jul 2016	2,001	–	30	21	10	12	8	14.5	4.5	9
Forsa	27 Jun–1 Jul 2016	2,504	27	35	21	10	13	6	9	6	14
Emnid	23–29 Jun 2016	1,936	–	33	23	10	12	6	11	5	10
INSA	24–27 Jun 2016	2,054	–	30	19	11	13	8	14	5	11
Forsa	20–24 Jun 2016	2,501	29	34	22	9	12	6	10	7	12
Forschungsgruppe Wahlen	20–23 Jun 2016	1,224	–	34	22	9	12	6	12	5	12
Emnid	16–22 Jun 2016	1,905	–	32	23	9	13	6	12	5	9
INSA	17–20 Jun 2016	2,017	–	31	20	11	13	7	13	5	11
Forsa	13–17 Jun 2016	2,503	29	33	21	9	13	6	11	7	12
Emnid	9–15 Jun 2016	2,744	–	33	22	9	13	6	12	5	11
Infratest dimap	13–15 Jun 2016	1,000	–	31	21	9	14	7	14	4	10
INSA	10–13 Jun 2016	2,047	–	30	19.5	11	12	8	14	5.5	10.5
Forsa	6–10 Jun 2016	2,505	30	33	21	10	13	6	11	6	12
Allensbach	27 May–9 Jun 2016	1,396	–	33.5	21	9	12	8	11.5	5	12.5
Emnid	2–8 Jun 2016	1,838	–	34	21	9	14	6	11	5	13
INSA	3–6 Jun 2016	2,032	–	30	19	10.5	13	8	14	5.5	11
Forsa	30 May–3 Jun 2016	2,501	29	34	21	10	13	7	10	5	13
Forschungsgruppe Wahlen	31 May–2 Jun 2016	1,292	–	33	21	9	13	6	13	5	12
Emnid	25 May–1 Jun 2016	1,851	–	33	22	9	13	6	12	5	11
GMS	27 May–1 Jun 2016	1,004	–	32	21	9	13	7	13	6	11
Infratest dimap	30 May–1 Jun 2016	1,506	–	32	21	9	13	6	15	4	11
INSA	25–30 May 2016	2,053	–	30	19	9.5	13	8	15	5.5	11
Forsa	23–27 May 2016	2,502	29	34	21	9	13	6	10	7	13
Emnid	19–24 May 2016	2,881	–	33	21	9	12	6	14	5	12
INSA	20–23 May 2016	2,022	–	30.5	19.5	10	13	7	15	5	11
Forsa	17–20 May 2016	2,006	30	33	20	9	14	6	12	6	13
Emnid	13–18 May 2016	1,485	–	32	22	9	12	6	13	6	10
Infratest dimap	17–18 May 2016	1,015	–	32	21	9	12	7	15	4	11
INSA	13–17 May 2016	1,947	–	30.5	19.5	10.5	13	7.5	15	4	11
Forsa	9–13 May 2016	2,501	29	34	19	9	14	7	11	6	15
Allensbach	28 Apr–12 May 2016	1,474	–	33.5	21	9	11.5	8	12.5	4.5	12.5
Forschungsgruppe Wahlen	10–12 May 2016	1,263	–	33	21	8	14	7	13	4	12
Emnid	6–11 May 2016	1,922	–	33	23	9	13	5	13	4	10
INSA	4–9 May 2016	2,048	–	30.5	19.5	10	13	8	15	4	11
Forsa	2–6 May 2016	2,002	27	34	21	9	13	8	10	5	13
Emnid	28 Apr–3 May 2016	1,838	–	32	22	9	12	6	14	5	10
Infratest dimap	2–3 May 2016	1,503	–	33	20	8	13	6	15	5	13
INSA	29 Apr–2 May 2016	2,036	–	32	19.5	10	13	8	13.5	4	12.5
Forsa	25–29 Apr 2016	2,501	28	34	21	9	13	8	9	6	13
Emnid	21–27 Apr 2016	2,805	–	33	22	9	12	6	13	5	11
INSA	22–25 Apr 2016	2,054	–	31	19.5	10	14	8	13.5	4	11.5
Forsa	18–22 Apr 2016	2,502	28	33	22	9	13	8	10	5	11
Forschungsgruppe Wahlen	19–21 Apr 2016	1,226	–	33	22	8	14	7	12	4	11
Emnid	14–20 Apr 2016	2,393	–	33	22	9	13	6	12	5	11
GMS	15–20 Apr 2016	1,008	–	35	21	9	12	7	11	5	14
Infratest dimap	18–20 Apr 2016	1,011	–	33	21	8	12	7	14	5	12
INSA	16–18 Apr 2016	2,010	–	31.5	19.5	9.5	13	7	13.5	6	12
Forsa	11–15 Apr 2016	2,504	29	34	21	9	13	7	11	5	13
Allensbach	1–14 Apr 2016	1,388	–	33.5	23	9	11	8	10.5	5	10.5
Emnid	7–13 Apr 2016	1,941	–	33	22	9	13	7	11	5	11
INSA	8–11 Apr 2016	1,997	–	31.5	19.5	9.5	13.5	7.5	12.5	6	12
Forsa	4–8 Apr 2016	2,506	29	34	21	9	14	7	10	5	13
Forschungsgruppe Wahlen	5–7 Apr 2016	1,261	–	36	22	7	12	7	12	4	14
Emnid	31 Mar–6 Apr 2016	2,240	–	34	22	8	13	7	12	4	12
Infratest dimap	4–6 Apr 2016	1,505	–	34	21	7	13	7	14	4	13
INSA	1–4 Apr 2016	2,036	–	32	20	9	12.5	7.5	13	6	12
Forsa	29 Mar–1 Apr 2016	2,004	27	35	21	8	13	7	10	6	14
Emnid	24–30 Mar 2016	1,405	–	33	22	8	13	6	13	5	11
INSA	24–29 Mar 2016	1,873	–	32	20	11	12.5	6	13	5.5	12
Forsa	21–24 Mar 2016	2,005	29	36	20	8	13	7	10	6	16
Emnid	17–23 Mar 2016	2,828	–	34	22	9	13	6	12	4	12
Infratest dimap	21–22 Mar 2016	1,000	–	34	22	8	12	7	13	4	12
INSA	18–21 Mar 2016	2,022	–	33	22	10.5	11	7	12	4.5	11
Forsa	14–18 Mar 2016	2,501	30	35	20	8	13	6	13	5	15
Forschungsgruppe Wahlen	15–17 Mar 2016	1,205	–	35	23	8	12	6	12	4	12
Emnid	10–16 Mar 2016	2,424	–	34	22	9	13	6	13	3	12
GMS	14–16 Mar 2016	1,010	–	36	21	8	10	7	14	4	15
INSA	11–14 Mar 2016	2,004	–	32	22	11	10	6.5	13	5.5	10
Forsa	7–11 Mar 2016	2,505	34	35	22	10	10	7	11	5	13
Allensbach	26 Feb–10 Mar 2016	1,456	–	35	24.5	9	10	7	10.5	4	10.5
Emnid	3–9 Mar 2016	2,340	–	36	24	9	11	5	11	4	12
INSA	4–7 Mar 2016	2,011	–	32.5	23	10	11	6.5	11.5	5.5	9.5
Forsa	29 Feb–4 Mar 2016	2,501	33	35	23	9	11	6	10	6	12
Emnid	25 Feb–2 Mar 2016	1,869	–	35	24	10	10	5	11	5	11
INSA	26–29 Feb 2016	2,007	–	32.5	23	11	11	6.5	11.5	4.5	9.5
Infratest dimap	26–27 Feb 2016	1,505	–	36	23	9	10	6	11	5	13
Forsa	22–26 Feb 2016	2,503	34	35	24	10	10	6	9	6	11
Emnid	18–24 Feb 2016	1,978	–	36	24	9	10	5	11	5	12
Infratest dimap	23–24 Feb 2016	1,028	–	37	23	8	11	6	10	5	14
INSA	19–22 Feb 2016	2,001	–	32.5	22.5	10	10.5	6.5	12.5	5.5	10
Forsa	15–19 Feb 2016	2,502	34	35	24	10	10	6	10	5	11
Forschungsgruppe Wahlen	16–18 Feb 2016	1,289	–	36	25	9	10	5	10	5	11
Emnid	11–17 Feb 2016	2,409	–	35	24	10	10	4	12	5	11
GMS	12–17 Feb 2016	1,009	–	37	24	10	9	5	11	4	13
INSA	12–15 Feb 2016	2,014	–	32.5	22.5	9.5	11	7	12.5	5	10
Forsa	8–12 Feb 2016	2,501	35	35	23	10	11	6	9	6	12
Allensbach	1–11 Feb 2016	1,521	–	33.5	24	10	10	7	10.5	5	9.5
Emnid	4–10 Feb 2016	2,090	–	35	24	9	9	5	12	6	11
INSA	5–9 Feb 2016	2,054	–	32.5	22	10.5	11	6	12	6	10.5
Forsa	1–5 Feb 2016	2,500	35	36	24	9	10	5	10	6	12
Emnid	28 Jan–3 Feb 2016	2,306	–	35	24	10	9	4	12	6	11
Infratest dimap	1–2 Feb 2016	1,504	–	35	24	9	10	5	12	5	11
INSA	29 Jan–1 Feb 2016	2,007	–	33	23	10	10	6	12.5	5.5	10
Forsa	25–29 Jan 2016	2,501	34	36	24	9	10	5	10	6	12
Forschungsgruppe Wahlen	26–28 Jan 2016	1,380	–	37	24	8	11	5	11	4	13
Emnid	21–27 Jan 2016	1,638	–	34	24	10	9	5	12	6	10
INSA	22–25 Jan 2016	2,047	–	32.5	23	9	10	6	13	6.5	9.5
Forsa	18–22 Jan 2016	2,505	36	36	24	10	10	5	10	5	12
Allensbach	7–21 Jan 2016	1,431	–	35	25	9.5	9	6.5	10	5	10
Emnid	14–20 Jan 2016	1,875	–	36	25	9	9	5	10	6	11
INSA	15–18 Jan 2016	2,051	–	32.5	22.5	10	9.5	6.5	12.5	6.5	10
Forsa	11–15 Jan 2016	2,501	36	37	23	9	10	5	10	6	14
Forschungsgruppe Wahlen	12–14 Jan 2016	1,203	–	37	24	8	10	5	11	5	13
Emnid	7–13 Jan 2016	2,016	–	38	24	9	10	5	9	5	14
Infratest dimap	12–13 Jan 2016	1,027	–	37	25	8	10	4	10	6	12
INSA	8–11 Jan 2016	2,039	–	35	21.5	10	10	6	11.5	6	13.5
Forsa	4–8 Jan 2016	2,503	35	38	23	10	10	5	9	5	15
Infratest dimap	5–7 Jan 2016	1,504	–	39	24	8	11	4	9	5	15
Emnid	5–6 Jan 2016	940	–	39	23	10	10	4	8	6	16
INSA	30 Dec 2015–4 Jan 2016	2,022	–	36	22.5	10	10	5	9.5	7	13.5
GMS	28 Dec 2015–3 Jan 2016	1,008	–	39	24	8	10	5	9	5	15

=== 2015 ===
Polling firm	Fieldwork date	Union	SPD	Linke	Grüne	FDP	AfD	Others	Lead
Forsa	30 December 2015	38	23	10	10	5	8	6	15
Forsa	23 December 2015	38	23	10	10	5	8	6	15
Emnid	22 December 2015	39	24	10	9	4	9	5	15
INSA	21 December 2015	35.5	23	11	9.5	6	9.5	5.5	12.5
Forsa	18 December 2015	39	24	10	10	4	8	5	15
Emnid	16 December 2015	38	25	9	9	5	8	6	13
Infratest dimap	16 December 2015	38	24	8	10	4	10	6	14
INSA	14 December 2015	35	23.5	10	9	5.5	10	7	11.5
Forsa	12 December 2015	39	24	9	11	4	8	5	15
Allensbach	10 December 2015	38	26	8.5	9.5	5	8	5	12
Forschungsgruppe Wahlen	10 December 2015	39	24	9	10	4	9	5	15
Emnid	9 December 2015	37	26	10	9	4	8	6	11
INSA	7 December 2015	35	23.5	9.5	9.5	6	10	6.5	11.5
Forsa	4 December 2015	38	24	9	10	4	8	7	14
Emnid	2 December 2015	37	25	10	10	4	8	6	12
Infratest dimap	1 December 2015	37	25	8	11	4	10	5	12
INSA	30 November 2015	34.5	23.5	9.5	9.5	5.5	10.5	7	11
Forsa	27 November 2015	39	24	9	10	5	6	7	15
Forschungsgruppe Wahlen	26 November 2015	39	25	8	9	4	9	6	14
Emnid	25 November 2015	38	25	10	10	4	8	5	13
INSA	23 November 2015	34.5	23	10.5	9	6	10	7	11.5
Forsa	22 November 2015	39	24	9	10	5	7	6	15
Infratest dimap	19 November 2015	37	25	8	10	5	9	6	12
Emnid	18 November 2015	37	26	9	9	5	7	7	11
GMS	18 November 2015	39	23	9	10	4	9	6	16
INSA	16 November 2015	35	23.5	10	10	5	10.5	6	11.5
Forsa	13 November 2015	36	25	9	10	5	8	7	11
Forschungsgruppe Wahlen	12 November 2015	39	26	9	9	4	8	5	13
Allensbach	11 November 2015	37.5	26	9.5	9.5	5.5	7	5	11.5
Emnid	11 November 2015	37	25	9	10	5	8	6	12
INSA	9 November 2015	34	24	11	10	6	10	5	10
Forsa	6 November 2015	38	25	8	10	5	7	7	13
Infratest dimap	4 November 2015	37	24	9	11	5	8	6	13
Emnid	4 November 2015	36	26	9	10	4	9	6	10
INSA	2 November 2015	35.5	24.5	10	10	5.5	8	6.5	11
Forsa	30 October 2015	36	24	9	11	5	7	8	12
Emnid	28 October 2015	36	25	10	10	5	8	6	11
INSA	26 October 2015	35	24.5	9.5	11	4.5	8.5	7	10.5
Forsa	23 October 2015	36	24	9	11	6	6	8	12
Forschungsgruppe Wahlen	22 October 2015	39	25	9	10	5	6	6	14
Emnid	21 October 2015	36	26	10	10	5	7	6	10
Infratest dimap	21 October 2015	38	24	9	11	5	8	5	14
INSA	19 October 2015	37	25	9.5	9.5	5	7.5	6.5	12
Allensbach	16 October 2015	38	26	9	9.5	5.5	7	5	12
Forsa	16 October 2015	38	24	10	11	4	7	6	14
Emnid	14 October 2015	37	26	10	9	5	7	6	11
INSA	12 October 2015	38	24.5	9	10	5	6.5	7	13.5
Forsa	9 October 2015	38	25	9	10	5	7	6	13
Forschungsgruppe Wahlen	8 October 2015	41	25	9	9	4	6	6	16
Emnid	7 October 2015	38	25	10	9	5	6	7	13
GMS	7 October 2015	40	25	9	10	5	5	6	15
INSA	5 October 2015	39	24	10	9.5	5	6	6.5	15
Forsa	2 October 2015	39	25	9	9	5	7	6	14
Emnid	30 September 2015	40	25	10	9	4	5	7	15
Infratest dimap	30 September 2015	40	24	9	10	5	6	6	16
INSA	28 September 2015	38.5	23.5	10.5	10.5	4	6	7	15
Forsa	25 September 2015	40	24	10	10	5	5	6	16
Forschungsgruppe Wahlen	24 September 2015	41	26	9	10	4	5	5	15
Emnid	23 September 2015	40	25	10	10	4	6	5	15
INSA	21 September 2015	39.5	24.5	10	9.5	4	6	6.5	15
Forsa	18 September 2015	40	24	10	10	5	4	7	16
Emnid	16 September 2015	40	24	9	10	5	5	7	16
GMS	16 September 2015	42	24	9	10	4	4	5	18
INSA	14 September 2015	40	24	9.5	10	4	5.5	7	16
Allensbach	12 September 2015	42	25.5	8.5	9.5	6	3.5	5	16.5
Forsa	11 September 2015	41	24	10	10	4	4	7	17
Forschungsgruppe Wahlen	10 September 2015	42	26	8	10	4	4	6	16
Emnid	9 September 2015	41	25	10	11	4	4	5	16
Infratest dimap	9 September 2015	42	25	9	11	4	4	5	17
INSA	7 September 2015	41.5	24	9.5	10.5	4	5	5.5	17.5
Forsa	4 September 2015	41	24	10	10	4	4	7	17
Emnid	2 September 2015	41	24	10	11	4	4	6	17
Infratest dimap	2 September 2015	42	24	8	12	4	4	6	18
INSA	31 August 2015	41.5	23.5	9.5	10	4	4.5	7	18
Forsa	28 August 2015	40	24	11	11	5	3	6	16
Emnid	26 August 2015	41	24	10	10	4	4	7	17
GMS	26 August 2015	42	25	10	10	5	3	4	17
INSA	24 August 2015	42	23.5	9.5	10.5	4	3.5	7	18.5
Forsa	21 August 2015	41	23	11	10	4	4	7	18
Forschungsgruppe Wahlen	20 August 2015	42	26	9	10	4	3	6	16
Emnid	19 August 2015	42	24	10	10	4	4	6	18
INSA	17 August 2015	41	24.5	9	11	4.5	4	6	16.5
Allensbach	14 August 2015	41.5	26	9	9.5	5.5	3.5	5	15.5
Forsa	14 August 2015	43	23	10	10	4	3	7	20
Emnid	12 August 2015	43	24	10	11	4	3	5	19
Infratest dimap	12 August 2015	42	24	9	11	4	4	6	18
INSA	10 August 2015	42.5	23	9	10.5	4.5	4	6.5	19.5
Forsa	7 August 2015	43	23	9	10	5	3	7	20
Emnid	5 August 2015	43	24	10	10	4	4	5	19
INSA	3 August 2015	43	24.5	9.5	10	4	3	6	18.5
Forsa	31 July 2015	41	24	9	10	5	3	8	17
Emnid	29 July 2015	43	24	9	10	4	3	7	19
Infratest dimap	29 July 2015	42	24	9	11	5	4	5	18
INSA	27 July 2015	41.5	25.5	9.5	9.5	4	3	7	16
Forsa	24 July 2015	42	23	10	10	4	3	8	19
Forschungsgruppe Wahlen	23 July 2015	41	25	9	11	4	4	6	16
Emnid	22 July 2015	43	24	10	10	4	3	6	19
GMS	22 July 2015	42	24	9	10	5	4	6	18
INSA	20 July 2015	42	25	9.5	9.5	4	3	7	17
Forsa	17 July 2015	41	24	10	10	5	4	6	17
Emnid	15 July 2015	43	25	9	11	4	4	4	18
Infratest dimap	15 July 2015	41	24	9	11	6	4	5	17
Allensbach	13 July 2015	40.5	25.5	9.5	10	5.5	4	5	15
INSA	13 July 2015	42	25.5	9.5	9.5	4	3.5	6	16.5
Forsa	10 July 2015	42	23	10	11	4	4	6	19
Emnid	8 July 2015	42	26	10	10	4	3	5	16
INSA	6 July 2015	43	24	9	10	4	4	6	19
Forsa	3 July 2015	42	23	10	11	5	4	5	19
Forschungsgruppe Wahlen	2 July 2015	41	26	9	11	4	4	5	15
Emnid	1 July 2015	40	24	10	11	4	5	6	16
Infratest dimap	1 July 2015	40	25	10	11	5	5	4	15
INSA	29 June 2015	39.5	24.5	9.5	9.5	5	4.5	7.5	15
Forsa	26 June 2015	42	23	10	10	5	4	6	19
Emnid	24 June 2015	41	24	10	10	4	5	6	17
GMS	24 June 2015	42	24	9	10	5	4	6	18
INSA	22 June 2015	40	25	9.5	10	4	4.5	7	15
Forsa	19 June 2015	41	23	10	10	5	4	7	18
Infratest dimap	17 June 2015	40	25	10	10	5	5	5	15
Emnid	17 June 2015	40	25	9	10	5	5	6	15
INSA	15 June 2015	41	24	10.5	9.5	4.5	4.5	6	17
Allensbach	14 June 2015	41.5	26	8.5	10	5	4	5	15.5
Forsa	12 June 2015	41	23	9	11	5	5	6	18
Forschungsgruppe Wahlen	11 June 2015	41	25	10	11	4	4	5	16
Emnid	10 June 2015	40	25	9	10	5	5	6	15
INSA	8 June 2015	40	24	10	10	5	5	6	16
Forsa	5 June 2015	41	24	9	10	6	4	6	17
Emnid	2 June 2015	40	25	10	10	5	5	5	15
Infratest dimap	2 June 2015	40	25	9	10	6	5	5	15
INSA	1 June 2015	41	25	8.5	10	5	5	5.5	16
Forsa	29 May 2015	40	23	10	10	6	5	6	17
Emnid	27 May 2015	40	25	9	10	6	5	5	15
INSA	25 May 2015	41	24.5	9.5	9.5	5	5.5	5	16.5
Forsa	22 May 2015	39	23	9	11	7	4	7	16
Forschungsgruppe Wahlen	21 May 2015	40	26	9	11	4	5	5	14
Emnid	20 May 2015	40	26	9	9	5	5	6	14
Infratest dimap	20 May 2015	41	26	9	9	5	5	5	15
INSA	18 May 2015	40.5	24	9.5	10	4.5	5.5	6	16.5
Forsa	15 May 2015	40	22	9	11	6	5	7	18
GMS	13 May 2015	41	25	10	11	4	5	4	16
Emnid	12 May 2015	40	25	9	10	4	5	7	15
INSA	11 May 2015	41.5	24.5	9.5	9	3	6	6.5	17
Allensbach	8 May 2015	41.5	25.5	9	9.5	5	5	4.5	16
Forsa	8 May 2015	41	23	9	12	4	5	6	18
Emnid	6 May 2015	40	25	10	10	3	6	6	15
Infratest dimap	6 May 2015	40	25	9	10	4	6	6	15
INSA	4 May 2015	41	25	9.5	9.5	3	6	6	16
Forsa	30 April 2015	42	24	9	10	4	4	7	18
Emnid	29 April 2015	41	25	9	10	3	6	6	16
INSA	27 April 2015	40.5	25	8.5	11	3	6	6	15.5
Forsa	24 April 2015	42	24	9	10	4	4	7	18
Emnid	22 April 2015	41	25	8	10	4	6	6	16
Infratest dimap	22 April 2015	41	24	8	11	4	6	6	17
INSA	20 April 2015	41	24.5	9	10	3.5	6.5	5.5	16.5
Forsa	17 April 2015	42	24	8	10	4	6	6	18
Forschungsgruppe Wahlen	16 April 2015	41	26	9	10	3	6	5	15
Emnid	15 April 2015	41	25	9	10	4	6	5	16
GMS	15 April 2015	42	24	9	10	5	5	5	18
INSA	13 April 2015	41	23.5	9.5	10	3	6.5	6.5	17.5
Allensbach	10 April 2015	40.5	26.5	8.5	9.5	5	6	4	14
Forsa	10 April 2015	42	24	8	10	5	5	6	18
Emnid	8 April 2015	41	25	9	10	4	5	6	16
INSA	7 April 2015	42	24	9	9	3	6.5	6.5	18
Forsa	2 April 2015	42	23	9	10	4	6	6	19
Emnid	1 April 2015	42	25	9	9	4	5	6	17
Infratest dimap	1 April 2015	41	25	9	10	4	6	5	16
INSA	30 March 2015	43	23.5	9	10	3	6	5.5	19.5
Forsa	27 March 2015	42	23	9	10	4	6	6	19
Forschungsgruppe Wahlen	26 March 2015	41	25	9	11	3	6	5	16
Emnid	25 March 2015	42	25	8	9	5	6	5	17
INSA	24 March 2015	41	24	9	9.5	4	6.5	6	17
GMS	23 March 2015	42	25	8	10	5	5	5	17
Forsa	20 March 2015	41	24	8	10	5	5	7	17
Emnid	17 March 2015	41	24	9	10	4	6	6	17
INSA	16 March 2015	41	22.5	10	9.5	3.5	7.5	6	18.5
Forsa	13 March 2015	41	24	9	9	5	6	6	17
Allensbach	12 March 2015	41.5	26	8	9.5	5	6	4	15.5
Forschungsgruppe Wahlen	12 March 2015	43	24	9	10	3	6	5	19
Emnid	11 March 2015	41	24	9	11	4	6	5	17
Infratest dimap	11 March 2015	41	24	9	11	4	6	5	17
INSA	9 March 2015	41	24.5	9	9.5	3	7.5	5.5	16.5
Forsa	6 March 2015	41	24	9	9	5	6	6	17
Emnid	4 March 2015	40	25	9	10	4	7	5	15
Infratest dimap	4 March 2015	41	25	9	10	4	6	5	16
INSA	2 March 2015	41	24	9	9.5	3	7.5	6	17
Forsa	27 February 2015	41	24	9	9	5	7	5	17
Forschungsgruppe Wahlen	26 February 2015	41	25	8	11	3	7	5	16
Emnid	25 February 2015	41	25	9	9	4	6	6	16
GMS	23 February 2015	42	23	9	11	4	6	5	19
INSA	23 February 2015	41	24.5	8.5	9.5	3	7.5	6	16.5
Forsa	20 February 2015	42	24	9	9	5	6	5	18
Emnid	18 February 2015	41	26	9	9	4	6	5	15
INSA	17 February 2015	42	24	8.5	10	3	7	5.5	18
Forsa	13 February 2015	43	23	8	10	5	5	6	20
Allensbach	12 February 2015	41	25.5	9	9.5	5	6	4	15.5
Emnid	11 February 2015	41	25	10	10	4	6	4	16
Infratest dimap	11 February 2015	42	24	8	10	3	7	6	18
Forsa	6 February 2015	42	23	9	10	5	6	5	19
INSA	9 February 2015	40.5	25	8.5	10.5	3	7.5	5	15.5
Emnid	4 February 2015	40	26	10	10	3	5	6	14
Infratest dimap	4 February 2015	41	25	9	10	3	6	6	16
INSA	2 February 2015	41	25	9	10	2.5	7	5.5	16
Forsa	30 January 2015	42	23	10	10	4	5	6	19
Forschungsgruppe Wahlen	29 January 2015	41	25	8	12	3	6	5	16
Emnid	28 January 2015	40	25	10	10	3	6	6	15
INSA	26 January 2015	42	24	8.5	10	3	7	5.5	18
Allensbach	23 January 2015	41.5	25	8.5	10.5	4	6	4.5	16.5
Forsa	23 January 2015	42	23	9	10	3	6	7	19
Emnid	21 January 2015	41	25	9	10	4	6	5	16
GMS	19 January 2015	42	24	10	10	3	6	5	18
INSA	19 January 2015	42	23	9	10	3.5	7	5.5	19
Forsa	16 January 2015	42	22	10	10	3	6	7	20
Forschungsgruppe Wahlen	15 January 2015	42	25	8	11	3	6	5	17
Emnid	14 January 2015	42	24	9	9	4	7	5	18
Infratest dimap	14 January 2015	41	25	8	10	4	6	6	16
INSA	12 January 2015	43	23	9	10	2.5	7.5	5	20
Forsa	9 January 2015	42	22	10	10	4	6	6	20
Emnid	7 January 2015	43	24	9	9	3	7	5	19
Infratest dimap	7 January 2015	41	26	8	10	3	6	6	15
Forsa	5 January 2015	42	22	10	11	3	5	7	20
INSA	5 January 2015	42.5	24	9.5	9	2	7.5	5.5	18.5

=== 2014 ===
Polling firm	Fieldwork date	Sample size	Union	SPD	Linke	Grüne	FDP	AfD	Others	Lead
Forsa	15–19 Dec 2014	2,504	42	23	11	10	2	5	7	19
Infratest dimap	15–17 Dec 2014	1,006	42	25	8	10	–	6	9	17
Emnid	11–17 Dec 2014	2,755	42	25	9	9	2	7	6	17
INSA	12–15 Dec 2014	2,017	41.5	24.5	10	9.5	2	7.5	5	17
GMS	10–15 Dec 2014	1,005	42	25	9	10	2	7	5	17
Forsa	8–12 Dec 2014	2,504	43	23	10	10	2	5	7	20
Allensbach	1–12 Dec 2014	1,505	40.5	26	8.5	9.5	3.5	7	5	14.5
Forschungsgruppe Wahlen	8–11 Dec 2014	1,269	42	25	8	12	–	6	7	17
Emnid	4–10 Dec 2014	2,764	41	25	9	10	3	6	6	16
INSA	5–8 Dec 2014	2,046	41	24	9.5	9.5	2	8	6	17
Forsa	1–5 Dec 2014	2,503	41	24	9	11	2	6	7	17
Infratest dimap	1–3 Dec 2014	1,502	40	26	9	11	2	7	5	14
Emnid	27 Nov–3 Dec 2014	2,789	41	26	9	10	3	6	5	15
INSA	28 Nov–1 Dec 2014	2,047	41.5	23	10	9	2	8.5	6	18.5
Forsa	24–28 Nov 2014	2,502	41	24	9	11	2	6	7	17
Forschungsgruppe Wahlen	25–27 Nov 2014	1,289	41	26	8	11	–	6	8	15
Emnid	20–26 Nov 2014	2,307	41	25	9	10	3	7	5	16
INSA	21–24 Nov 2014	1,979	41	24	10.5	9	2.5	7.5	5.5	17
GMS	19–24 Nov 2014	1,009	42	25	8	9	3	6	7	17
Forsa	17–21 Nov 2014	2,501	42	23	10	10	2	6	7	19
Infratest dimap	17–19 Nov 2014	1,023	41	26	8	11	3	6	5	15
Emnid	13–19 Nov 2014	2,331	42	25	8	10	3	6	6	17
INSA	14–17 Nov 2014	2,017	40	25	10	10	2.5	7	5.5	15
Forsa	10–14 Nov 2014	2,501	42	22	9	10	3	7	7	20
Forschungsgruppe Wahlen	11–13 Nov 2014	1,242	41	26	8	10	–	7	8	15
Allensbach	1–13 Nov 2014	?	40.5	27	8	9.5	3.5	6.5	5	13.5
Emnid	6–12 Nov 2014	2,313	41	24	9	10	3	7	6	17
INSA	7–10 Nov 2014	2,028	41	24.5	9	10	3.5	8	4	16.5
Forsa	3–7 Nov 2014	2,502	41	23	10	9	3	8	6	18
Infratest dimap	3–5 Nov 2014	1,504	41	25	9	10	3	7	5	16
INSA	3–5 Nov 2014	2,020	41	25	9	9	2.5	8	5.5	16
Emnid	30 Oct–5 Nov 2014	2,333	41	25	9	9	2	7	7	16
Forsa	27–31 Oct 2014	2,504	41	22	9	10	3	8	7	19
Emnid	23–29 Oct 2014	2,312	41	25	9	9	3	7	6	16
INSA	24–27 Oct 2014	2,003	41	24	9	10	2	8	6	17
Forsa	20–24 Oct 2014	2,504	41	23	9	10	2	8	7	18
Forschungsgruppe Wahlen	21–23 Oct 2014	1,268	41	26	8	9	3	7	6	15
Infratest dimap	20–22 Oct 2014	1,022	40	26	9	10	2	7	6	14
Emnid	16–22 Oct 2014	2,309	41	25	9	9	3	6	7	16
INSA	17–20 Oct 2014	2,005	40.5	24.5	9	9	2.5	8	6.5	16
GMS	15–20 Oct 2014	1,016	41	24	9	9	3	7	7	17
Forsa	13–17 Oct 2014	2,504	41	24	9	9	2	8	7	17
Allensbach	4–16 Oct 2014	?	39.5	26	8.5	10.5	3	7.5	5	13.5
Emnid	9–15 Oct 2014	2,778	42	24	9	9	3	7	6	18
INSA	10–13 Oct 2014	2,043	40	24	9	10	2	9	6	16
Forsa	6–10 Oct 2014	2,505	40	23	9	10	3	8	7	17
Forschungsgruppe Wahlen	7–9 Oct 2014	1,379	41	25	8	9	3	8	6	16
Emnid	2–8 Oct 2014	2,323	42	24	8	10	2	8	6	18
INSA	3–6 Oct 2014	2,030	39	24	8	11	3	8	7	15
Forsa	29 Sep–2 Oct 2014	2,004	41	23	9	10	2	8	7	18
Infratest dimap	29 Sep–1 Oct 2014	1,502	41	24	10	9	2	9	5	17
Emnid	25 Sep–1 Oct 2014	2,753	41	24	9	10	2	9	5	17
INSA	26–29 Sep 2014	2,037	38.5	25	9.5	11	3	8.5	4.5	13.5
Forsa	22–26 Sep 2014	2,501	42	23	8	9	2	9	7	19
Forschungsgruppe Wahlen	23–25 Sep 2014	1,184	41	26	8	9	3	7	6	15
Infratest dimap	22–24 Sep 2014	1,008	39	25	10	10	3	8	5	14
Emnid	18–24 Sep 2014	2,760	40	25	10	9	2	8	6	15
INSA	19–22 Sep 2014	2,019	39.5	24	9	10	3	8	6.5	15.5
GMS	17–22 Sep 2014	1,011	41	24	9	9	3	9	6	17
Forsa	15–19 Sep 2014	2,501	42	22	9	8	2	10	7	20
Emnid	11–17 Sep 2014	2,319	40	25	9	9	3	8	6	15
INSA	12–15 Sep 2014	2,020	39	25	9.5	10	3.5	7	6	14
Forsa	8–12 Sep 2014	2,503	41	24	9	9	3	7	7	17
Allensbach	1–11 Sep 2014	?	41	25.5	8.5	10	4	6.5	4.5	15.5
Emnid	4–10 Sep 2014	2,285	41	25	9	9	3	7	6	16
INSA	5–8 Sep 2014	2,030	39.5	23	9	11	3.5	6	8	16.5
Forsa	1–5 Sep 2014	2,502	42	23	9	9	3	7	7	19
Forschungsgruppe Wahlen	2–4 Sep 2014	1,179	42	25	9	9	3	6	6	17
Infratest dimap	1–3 Sep 2014	1,503	40	24	10	10	3	7	6	16
Emnid	28 Aug–3 Sep 2014	2,766	42	25	10	9	3	6	5	17
INSA	29 Aug–1 Sep 2014	2,036	40	25	10	10	3	6	6	15
Forsa	25–29 Aug 2014	2,504	41	24	10	10	3	5	7	17
Infratest dimap	26–27 Aug 2014	1,027	42	25	9	9	3	5	7	17
Emnid	21–27 Aug 2014	2,418	43	26	9	9	3	5	5	17
INSA	22–25 Aug 2014	1,998	42	25	9.5	10	3.5	5	5	17
Forsa	18–22 Aug 2014	2,504	42	24	9	10	3	5	7	18
Forschungsgruppe Wahlen	19–21 Aug 2014	1,264	41	25	9	10	4	4	7	16
Emnid	14–20 Aug 2014	3,215	41	26	9	10	4	4	6	15
INSA	15–18 Aug 2014	2,005	41	26	9	10	3.5	5	5.5	15
GMS	13–18 Aug 2014	1,007	41	26	9	10	3	4	7	15
Forsa	11–15 Aug 2014	2,502	42	24	9	10	3	5	7	18
Emnid	7–13 Aug 2014	1,865	41	27	9	10	3	4	6	14
INSA	8–11 Aug 2014	2,006	42	26	9	9.5	3	5.5	5	16
Forsa	4–8 Aug 2014	2,500	42	24	9	10	4	5	6	18
Infratest dimap	4–6 Aug 2014	1,503	41	26	9	10	3	5	6	15
Emnid	31 Jul–6 Aug 2014	2,802	41	27	9	9	3	5	6	14
Allensbach	21 Jul–5 Aug 2014	?	41	26.5	8	10	3	6.5	5	14.5
INSA	1–4 Aug 2014	2,032	41	25	9.5	9.5	3	4.5	7.5	16
Forsa	28 Jul–1 Aug 2014	2,501	43	24	9	9	4	5	6	19
Emnid	24–30 Jul 2014	1,940	42	25	9	10	3	5	6	17
INSA	25–28 Jul 2014	2,014	40	24.5	9	10.5	3.5	5	7.5	15.5
Forsa	21–25 Jul 2014	2,501	43	22	10	10	3	5	7	21
Emnid	17–23 Jul 2014	2,762	41	25	10	10	3	5	6	16
INSA	18–21 Jul 2014	2,044	41	24	9	10	3.5	6	6.5	17
GMS	16–21 Jul 2014	1,004	40	26	8	10	4	5	7	14
Forsa	14–18 Jul 2014	2,505	43	22	10	10	3	5	7	21
Forschungsgruppe Wahlen	15–17 Jul 2014	1,273	41	24	9	11	3	5	7	17
Infratest dimap	15–16 Jul 2014	1,008	40	26	10	10	4	4	6	14
Emnid	10–16 Jul 2014	2,414	40	26	9	10	3	5	7	14
INSA	11–14 Jul 2014	2,018	40	24	9	11	3.5	6	6.5	16
Forsa	7–11 Jul 2014	2,503	41	23	9	11	3	6	7	18
Allensbach	28 Jun–11 Jul 2014	?	40.5	25	8.5	11	3.5	6	5.5	15.5
Emnid	3–9 Jul 2014	2,258	40	25	9	11	3	5	7	15
INSA	4–7 Jul 2014	2,033	40	25	9	10	4	5.5	6.5	15
Forsa	30 Jun–4 Jul 2014	2,014	41	23	9	11	3	6	7	18
Infratest dimap	30 Jun–2 Jul 2014	1,505	39	26	9	11	4	5	6	13
Emnid	27 Jun–2 Jul 2014	2,287	40	25	9	10	3	6	7	15
INSA	27–30 Jun 2014	2,044	41	24	9	10	3.5	6	6.5	17
Forsa	23–27 Jun 2014	2,502	41	23	9	10	4	7	6	18
Forschungsgruppe Wahlen	23–25 Jun 2014	1,315	39	25	9	11	3	6	7	14
Emnid	19–25 Jun 2014	2,287	40	25	9	10	3	7	6	15
INSA	20–23 Jun 2014	2,020	40.5	24	9	11	3	6	6.5	16.5
GMS	17–23 Jun 2014	1,007	39	25	9	11	4	6	6	14
Forsa	16–20 Jun 2014	2,504	41	23	9	10	4	7	6	18
Infratest dimap	17–18 Jun 2014	1,000	39	25	8	12	4	6	6	14
Emnid	12–17 Jun 2014	1,845	39	25	9	10	4	7	6	14
INSA	13–16 Jun 2014	1,993	39.5	25	8.5	11	4	6	6	14.5
Forsa	10–13 Jun 2014	2,001	39	23	10	10	4	7	7	16
Allensbach	28 May–13 Jun 2014	?	40	26	8	10	4	6	6	14
Emnid	5–11 Jun 2014	2,311	39	25	10	11	4	6	5	14
INSA	6–10 Jun 2014	2,036	39	24.5	9	11	4.5	6.5	5.5	14.5
Forsa	2–6 Jun 2014	2,501	39	23	10	9	4	8	7	16
Infratest dimap	2–4 Jun 2014	1,504	38	26	9	11	4	7	5	12
Forschungsgruppe Wahlen	2–4 Jun 2014	1,215	39	26	9	11	3	5	7	13
Emnid	28 May–4 Jun 2014	2,299	39	25	10	10	3	7	6	14
INSA	30 May–2 Jun 2014	2,014	38	26	9	11	3.5	6	6.5	12
Forsa	26–30 May 2014	2,002	38	23	10	10	4	8	7	15
Emnid	22–27 May 2014	2,311	39	25	10	10	4	6	6	14
INSA	23–26 May 2014	2,009	39	26	9	10	4	6	6	13
Forsa	19–23 May 2014	2,503	40	25	10	10	4	6	5	15
Emnid	15–21 May 2014	2,312	39	24	10	10	5	6	6	15
INSA	16–19 May 2014	2,009	40	25	9	10	4	5	7	15
Forsa	12–16 May 2014	2,501	40	24	10	10	4	6	6	16
Infratest dimap	12–14 May 2014	1,500	39	26	9	11	4	6	5	13
Emnid	8–14 May 2014	2,791	39	25	10	10	5	6	5	14
INSA	9–12 May 2014	2,033	40	23.5	10	11	4	5.5	6	16.5
GMS	7–12 May 2014	1,005	41	25	9	11	4	5	5	16
Forsa	5–9 May 2014	2,504	40	24	10	10	4	6	6	16
Allensbach	25 Apr–9 May 2014	?	39.5	26	8	10.5	5	5.5	5.5	13.5
Forschungsgruppe Wahlen	6–8 May 2014	1,223	40	25	10	11	4	4	6	15
Emnid	30 Apr–7 May 2014	2,306	40	25	9	11	4	5	6	15
INSA	2–5 May 2014	2,082	41	25	9	11	3	5	6	16
Forsa	28 Apr–2 May 2014	2,001	41	23	10	10	4	5	7	18
Infratest dimap	28–29 Apr 2014	1,600	40	26	9	10	4	5	6	14
Emnid	24–29 Apr 2014	2,203	40	25	10	10	4	5	6	15
INSA	25–28 Apr 2014	2,093	41.5	24	9	10	4.5	5.5	5.5	17.5
Forsa	22–25 Apr 2014	2,002	41	24	9	10	4	6	6	17
Infratest dimap	22–23 Apr 2014	1,008	41	25	10	10	4	5	5	16
Emnid	17–23 Apr 2014	1,859	41	24	10	10	4	5	6	17
INSA	18–21 Apr 2014	2,089	41	24.5	9	10.5	4.5	5	5.5	16.5
Forsa	14–17 Apr 2014	2,002	41	24	10	10	4	5	6	17
Emnid	10–16 Apr 2014	2,313	40	25	9	10	4	6	6	15
GMS	10–15 Apr 2014	1,008	41	24	10	10	4	6	5	17
INSA	11–14 Apr 2014	2,080	40.5	23.5	10	10	5	5.5	5.5	17
Forsa	7–11 Apr 2014	2,501	41	23	10	10	4	6	6	18
Forschungsgruppe Wahlen	8–10 Apr 2014	1,226	41	25	10	10	4	4	6	16
Allensbach	28 Mar–10 Apr 2014	1,571	40	26.5	8	11	4.5	5	5	13.5
Emnid	3–9 Apr 2014	2,327	42	23	10	9	4	6	6	19
INSA	4–7 Apr 2014	2,085	41	24	10	10	4	6	5	17
Forsa	31 Mar–4 Apr 2014	2,502	42	23	10	10	4	5	6	19
Infratest dimap	31 Mar–2 Apr 2014	1,506	41	26	9	10	4	5	5	15
Emnid	27 Mar–2 Apr 2014	2,271	41	24	10	10	3	6	6	17
INSA	28–31 Mar 2014	2,087	41	24.5	9	11	3	5	6.5	16.5
Forsa	24–28 Mar 2014	2,501	42	23	10	9	4	6	6	19
Forschungsgruppe Wahlen	25–27 Mar 2014	1,255	41	25	10	10	3	5	6	16
Infratest dimap	25–26 Mar 2014	1,000	41	25	8	10	4	5	7	16
Emnid	20–26 Mar 2014	2,380	41	25	10	11	3	5	5	16
INSA	21–24 Mar 2014	2,088	41	25	10	10	4	5	5	16
Forsa	17–21 Mar 2014	2,502	41	23	10	10	4	5	7	18
Emnid	13–19 Mar 2014	2,762	41	25	10	10	3	5	6	16
INSA	14–17 Mar 2014	2,102	40.5	24.5	10	10	4	5	6	16
GMS	12–17 Mar 2014	1,006	41	24	10	11	4	5	5	17
Forsa	10–14 Mar 2014	2,500	42	23	10	9	4	5	7	19
Forschungsgruppe Wahlen	11–13 Mar 2014	1,284	41	25	10	10	4	4	6	16
Allensbach	1–13 Mar 2014	?	40.5	25	9	10	5	5	5.5	15.5
Emnid	6–12 Mar 2014	2,780	41	24	10	11	4	5	5	17
INSA	7–10 Mar 2014	2,085	41	25.5	8.5	10	4	5.5	5.5	15.5
Forsa	3–7 Mar 2014	2,503	42	23	10	9	4	5	7	19
Infratest dimap	4–5 Mar 2014	1,515	42	24	9	11	4	4	6	18
Emnid	27 Feb–5 Mar 2014	2,304	42	23	10	10	3	5	7	19
INSA	28 Feb–3 Mar 2014	2,043	41	24.5	9.5	11	4	5	5	16.5
Forsa	24–28 Feb 2014	2,500	40	22	11	10	4	6	7	18
Infratest dimap	24–26 Feb 2014	1,026	40	26	9	10	4	5	6	14
Emnid	20–26 Feb 2014	2,763	40	24	10	10	4	5	7	16
INSA	21–24 Feb 2014	2,100	40.5	25.5	9	10	4	5.5	5.5	15
GMS	19–24 Feb 2014	1,005	41	24	9	11	4	5	5	17
Forsa	17–21 Feb 2014	2,502	41	22	10	10	5	5	7	19
Forschungsgruppe Wahlen	18–20 Feb 2014	1,219	43	24	10	10	4	4	5	19
Emnid	13–19 Feb 2014	2,421	41	24	10	10	4	5	6	17
INSA	14–17 Feb 2014	2,080	41	25	10	10	4	5	5	16
Forsa	10–14 Feb 2014	2,502	40	24	10	10	4	5	7	16
Allensbach	1–13 Feb 2014	?	40	26.5	9	10.5	4	5	5	13.5
Emnid	6–12 Feb 2014	2,388	41	24	10	11	4	5	5	17
INSA	7–10 Feb 2014	2,102	41	26	9.5	9	4	5	5.5	15
Forsa	3–7 Feb 2014	2,502	41	24	10	10	4	4	7	17
Infratest dimap	3–5 Feb 2014	1,536	41	27	9	9	4	5	5	14
Emnid	30 Jan–5 Feb 2014	2,301	42	25	9	10	4	4	6	17
INSA	31 Jan–3 Feb 2014	2,110	41.5	25	9	9.5	4.5	5	6	16.5
Forsa	27–31 Jan 2014	2,501	42	24	9	10	4	4	7	18
Forschungsgruppe Wahlen	28–30 Jan 2014	1,208	43	25	10	10	4	4	5	18
Infratest dimap	27–29 Jan 2014	1,014	42	27	8	9	4	4	6	15
Emnid	23–29 Jan 2014	2,295	42	25	10	9	4	4	6	17
INSA	24–27 Jan 2014	2,079	41	26.5	8.5	9.5	4.5	4	6	14.5
Forsa	20–24 Jan 2014	2,503	42	23	9	11	4	4	7	19
Allensbach	10–23 Jan 2014	?	40	26	8.5	10	5	5	5.5	14
Emnid	16–22 Jan 2014	2,772	41	26	9	9	5	4	6	15
INSA	17–20 Jan 2014	2,096	41	26	9	9.5	4.5	4	6	15
GMS	15–20 Jan 2014	1,007	42	25	9	9	4	4	7	17
Forsa	13–17 Jan 2014	2,502	41	23	10	10	5	4	7	18
Forschungsgruppe Wahlen	14–16 Jan 2014	1,237	43	24	10	9	4	4	6	19
Emnid	9–15 Jan 2014	2,305	41	26	10	8	4	5	6	15
INSA	10–13 Jan 2014	2,083	41	26	9.5	10	4	4	5.5	15
Forsa	6–10 Jan 2014	2,503	40	23	10	10	5	5	7	17
Infratest dimap	6–8 Jan 2014	1,559	41	27	8	9	4	4	7	14
Emnid	4–8 Jan 2014	1,402	42	25	9	9	4	5	6	17
INSA	3–6 Jan 2014	2,067	41.5	25	10	9	4	5	5.5	16.5
Forsa	2–3 Jan 2014	1,003	41	23	10	10	5	5	6	18

=== 2013 ===
Polling firm	Fieldwork date	Sample size	Union	SPD	Linke	Grüne	FDP	AfD	Others	Lead
Forsa	16–20 Dec 2013	2,508	42	24	10	10	5	4	5	18
Infratest dimap	17–18 Dec 2013	1,000	42	27	8	9	4	4	6	15
Emnid	12–18 Dec 2013	2,346	41	25	9	9	4	5	7	16
INSA	13–16 Dec 2013	2,100	42	27	9	9	4	4	5	15
Forsa	9–13 Dec 2013	2,505	42	24	10	9	4	5	6	18
Forschungsgruppe Wahlen	10–12 Dec 2013	1,255	42	25	10	9	4	4	6	17
Allensbach	1–12 Dec 2013	?	41.5	25.5	9	10.5	4	4.5	5	16
Emnid	5–11 Dec 2013	1,901	42	25	9	9	4	5	6	17
INSA	6–9 Dec 2013	2,090	42	25	9.5	10	4	4.5	5	17
GMS	4–9 Dec 2013	1,004	43	25	9	10	3	4	6	18
Forsa	2–6 Dec 2013	2,504	43	24	10	9	3	5	6	19
Infratest dimap	2–4 Dec 2013	1,523	43	25	9	10	3	4	6	18
Emnid	28 Nov–4 Dec 2013	2,291	42	26	9	9	3	5	6	16
INSA	29 Nov–2 Dec 2013	2,093	42.5	24	9.5	11	3.5	4	5.5	18.5
Forsa	25–29 Nov 2013	2,507	42	23	10	10	3	5	7	19
Forschungsgruppe Wahlen	26–28 Nov 2013	1,270	42	26	10	8	3	5	6	16
Emnid	21–27 Nov 2013	2,389	41	26	9	9	4	5	6	15
INSA	22–25 Nov 2013	2,095	40.5	25.5	9	10.5	4	4	6.5	15
Forsa	18–22 Nov 2013	2,500	42	23	10	9	3	5	8	19
Allensbach	8–21 Nov 2013	?	40	26.5	9.5	10	4	5	5	13.5
Infratest dimap	19–20 Nov 2013	1,006	42	25	9	10	3	4	6	17
Emnid	14–20 Nov 2013	2,204	42	25	9	10	3	5	6	17
INSA	15–18 Nov 2013	2,093	41	25	9.5	10	4	4.5	6	16
GMS	13–18 Nov 2013	1,009	41	25	9	9	4	5	7	16
Forsa	11–15 Nov 2013	2,501	41	24	10	10	4	5	6	17
Emnid	7–13 Nov 2013	2,765	41	25	9	10	3	5	7	16
INSA	6–11 Nov 2013	2,099	42	25	8.5	11	4	4.5	5	17
Forsa	4–8 Nov 2013	2,501	41	24	10	9	4	5	7	17
Forschungsgruppe Wahlen	5–7 Nov 2013	1,288	42	26	9	9	3	5	6	16
Infratest dimap	4–6 Nov 2013	1,520	42	26	9	10	3	4	6	16
Emnid	31 Oct–6 Nov 2013	2,296	41	26	9	10	3	5	6	15
INSA	1–4 Nov 2013	2,086	42	26	9	10.5	3.5	4	5	16
Forsa	28 Oct–1 Nov 2013	2,500	42	25	9	9	3	5	7	17
Emnid	24–30 Oct 2013	2,768	42	25	9	9	3	5	7	17
INSA	25–28 Oct 2013	2,097	42	26.5	9	10	3.5	4.5	4.5	15.5
Forsa	21–25 Oct 2013	2,501	42	24	9	9	4	5	7	18
Infratest dimap	21–23 Oct 2013	1,028	40	27	9	9	4	5	6	13
Emnid	17–23 Oct 2013	3,219	41	26	9	10	3	5	6	15
INSA	18–21 Oct 2013	2,117	43	26	8.5	10	3.5	4	5	17
Forsa	14–18 Oct 2013	2,500	43	25	9	8	4	5	6	18
Forschungsgruppe Wahlen	15–17 Oct 2013	1,183	42	26	10	8	3	5	6	16
Emnid	10–16 Oct 2013	2,334	42	25	10	9	3	5	6	17
Allensbach	1–16 Oct 2013	?	41	25	9	9	5	5.5	5.5	16
INSA	11–14 Oct 2013	1,998	42	26	9	9	4	6	4	16
GMS	9–14 Oct 2013	1,010	42	25	9	9	3	6	8	17
Forsa	7–11 Oct 2013	2,501	44	24	8	8	4	6	6	20
INSA	8–9 Oct 2013	2,030	43	25	9	9	4	5	5	18
Infratest dimap	7–9 Oct 2013	1,503	42	26	9	8	3	4.5	7.5	16
Emnid	4–9 Oct 2013	1,833	42	25	10	9	3	6	5	17
Forsa	30 Sep–4 Oct 2013	2,000	45	24	8	8	3	6	6	21
Emnid	26 Sep–1 Oct 2013	1,849	42	25	9	8	4	6	6	17
Forsa	23–27 Sep 2013	2,499	42	25	9	8	4	5	7	17
Emnid	24–26 Sep 2013	1,382	43	26	9	7	3	6	6	17
Forschungsgruppe Wahlen	24–26 Sep 2013	1,293	43	26	10	7	3	5	6	17
2013 federal election	22 Sep 2013	—N/a	41.5	25.7	8.6	8.4	4.8	4.7	6.3	15.8

== YouGov model ==
For the 2017 German federal election, YouGov is publishing figures for a model similar to those created for the 2016 United States presidential election, 2016 United Kingdom European Union membership referendum, and 2017 United Kingdom general election using Multilevel Regression with Poststratification (MRP), which utilizes demographic data on individuals' characteristics to project results across different states and constituencies using approximately 1,200 online interviews each day with voters in the YouGov panel.

Polling firm	Date	Voting intentions								Seat projections							
Polling firm	Date	Union	SPD	Linke	Grüne	FDP	AfD	Other	Lead	Union	SPD	Linke	Grüne	FDP	AfD	Other	Total
YouGov	22 Sep 2017	36	25	10	7	7	12	4	11	256	176	73	46	53	83	0	687
YouGov	19 Sep 2017	36	25	10	6	7	12	4	11	255	176	74	44	52	85	0	686
2013 election	22 Sep 2013	41.5	25.7	8.6	8.4	4.8	4.7	1.5	15.8	311	193	64	63	0	0	0	631

=== By state ===
Brandenburg

Polling firm	Date	CDU	SPD	Linke	Grüne	FDP	AfD	Other	Lead
2017 election	24 Sep 2017	26.7	17.6	17.2	5.0	7.1	20.2	6.3	6.5
YouGov	22 Sep 2017	28	20	23	3	6	16	5	5
YouGov	19 Sep 2017	28	19	23	3	6	17	5	5
2013 election	22 Sep 2013	34.8	23.1	22.4	4.7	2.5	6.0	6.5	11.6

Berlin

Polling firm	Date	CDU	SPD	Linke	Grüne	FDP	AfD	Other	Lead
2017 election	24 Sep 2017	22.7	17.9	18.8	12.6	8.9	12.0	7.0	3.9
YouGov	22 Sep 2017	23	23	20	8	7	13	7	Tie
YouGov	19 Sep 2017	23	22	19	8	6	15	7	1
2013 election	22 Sep 2013	28.5	24.6	18.5	12.3	3.6	4.9	7.7	3.9

Baden-Württemberg

Polling firm	Date	CDU	SPD	Linke	Grüne	FDP	AfD	Other	Lead
2017 election	24 Sep 2017	34.4	16.4	6.4	13.5	12.7	12.2	4.5	18.0
YouGov	22 Sep 2017	40	21	7	9	9	12	4	19
YouGov	19 Sep 2017	40	21	7	9	8	12	4	19
2013 election	22 Sep 2013	45.7	20.6	4.8	11.0	6.2	5.2	6.5	25.1

Bavaria

Polling firm	Date	CSU	SPD	Linke	Grüne	FDP	AfD	Other	Lead
2017 election	24 Sep 2017	38.8	15.3	6.1	9.8	10.2	12.4	7.5	23.5
YouGov	22 Sep 2017	43	20	6	7	8	11	6	23
YouGov	19 Sep 2017	42	20	7	7	8	11	6	22
2013 election	22 Sep 2013	49.3	20.0	3.8	8.4	5.1	4.3	9.2	29.3

Bremen

Polling firm	Date	CDU	SPD	Linke	Grüne	FDP	AfD	Other	Lead
2017 election	24 Sep 2017	25.0	26.3	13.5	11.0	9.3	10.0	4.3	1.3
YouGov	22 Sep 2017	26	33	13	9	6	10	3	7
YouGov	19 Sep 2017	26	35	12	8	6	10	3	9
2013 election	22 Sep 2013	29.3	35.6	10.1	12.1	3.4	3.7	5.7	6.3

Hesse

Polling firm	Date	CDU	SPD	Linke	Grüne	FDP	AfD	Other	Lead
2017 election	24 Sep 2017	30.9	23.5	8.1	9.7	11.6	11.9	4.4	7.4
YouGov	22 Sep 2017	34	28	8	8	8	11	4	6
YouGov	19 Sep 2017	34	28	8	7	8	11	3	6
2013 election	22 Sep 2013	39.2	28.8	6.0	9.9	5.6	5.6	4.9	10.4

Hamburg

Polling firm	Date	CDU	SPD	Linke	Grüne	FDP	AfD	Other	Lead
2017 election	24 Sep 2017	27.2	23.5	12.2	13.9	10.8	7.8	4.5	3.7
YouGov	22 Sep 2017	29	30	11	10	8	11	3	1
YouGov	19 Sep 2017	28	31	10	9	7	11	4	3
2013 election	22 Sep 2013	32.1	32.4	8.8	12.7	4.8	4.2	5.0	0.3

Mecklenburg-Vorpommern

Polling firm	Date	CDU	SPD	Linke	Grüne	FDP	AfD	Other	Lead
2017 election	24 Sep 2017	33.1	15.1	17.8	4.3	6.2	18.6	4.9	14.5
YouGov	22 Sep 2017	34	16	21	3	6	17	3	13
YouGov	19 Sep 2017	34	15	22	3	6	17	4	12
2013 election	22 Sep 2013	42.5	17.8	21.5	4.3	2.2	5.6	6.0	21.0

Lower Saxony

Polling firm	Date	CDU	SPD	Linke	Grüne	FDP	AfD	Other	Lead
2017 election	24 Sep 2017	34.9	27.4	6.9	8.7	9.3	9.1	3.6	7.5
YouGov	22 Sep 2017	36	32	7	7	7	9	3	4
YouGov	19 Sep 2017	36	32	7	6	7	9	2	4
2013 election	22 Sep 2013	41.1	33.1	5.0	8.8	4.2	3.7	4.1	8.0

North Rhine-Westphalia

Polling firm	Date	CDU	SPD	Linke	Grüne	FDP	AfD	Other	Lead
2017 election	24 Sep 2017	32.6	26.0	7.5	7.6	13.1	9.4	3.8	6.6
YouGov	22 Sep 2017	35	31	8	6	8	10	3	4
YouGov	19 Sep 2017	35	31	8	6	7	10	3	4
2013 election	22 Sep 2013	39.8	31.9	6.1	8.0	5.2	3.9	5.0	7.9

Rhineland-Palatinate

Polling firm	Date	CDU	SPD	Linke	Grüne	FDP	AfD	Other	Lead
2017 election	24 Sep 2017	35.9	24.2	6.8	7.6	10.4	11.2	3.9	11.5
YouGov	22 Sep 2017	38	27	8	6	8	11	3	11
YouGov	19 Sep 2017	38	27	8	6	7	11	4	11
2013 election	22 Sep 2013	43.3	27.5	5.4	7.6	5.5	4.8	5.8	15.8

Schleswig-Holstein

Polling firm	Date	CDU	SPD	Linke	Grüne	FDP	AfD	Other	Lead
2017 election	24 Sep 2017	34.0	23.3	7.3	12.0	12.6	8.2	2.7	10.7
YouGov	22 Sep 2017	35	30	7	7	8	10	3	5
YouGov	19 Sep 2017	35	31	8	7	7	10	3	4
2013 election	22 Sep 2013	39.2	31.5	5.2	9.4	5.6	4.6	4.4	7.7

Saarland

Polling firm	Date	CDU	SPD	Linke	Grüne	FDP	AfD	Other	Lead
2017 election	24 Sep 2017	32.4	27.2	12.9	6.0	7.6	10.1	3.9	5.2
YouGov	22 Sep 2017	33	30	13	4	6	11	3	3
YouGov	19 Sep 2017	33	30	12	4	6	11	4	3
2013 election	22 Sep 2013	37.8	31.0	10.0	5.7	3.8	5.2	6.5	6.7

Saxony

Polling firm	Date	CDU	SPD	Linke	Grüne	FDP	AfD	Other	Lead
2017 election	24 Sep 2017	26.9	10.5	16.1	4.6	8.2	27.0	6.7	0.1
YouGov	22 Sep 2017	34	14	20	4	7	17	5	14
YouGov	19 Sep 2017	34	12	20	4	6	18	6	14
2013 election	22 Sep 2013	42.6	14.6	20.0	4.9	3.1	6.8	8.0	22.6

Saxony-Anhalt

Polling firm	Date	CDU	SPD	Linke	Grüne	FDP	AfD	Other	Lead
2017 election	24 Sep 2017	30.3	15.2	17.8	3.7	7.8	19.6	5.7	10.7
YouGov	22 Sep 2017	33	16	24	3	6	15	4	9
YouGov	19 Sep 2017	33	15	24	3	6	16	4	9
2013 election	22 Sep 2013	41.2	18.2	23.9	4.0	2.6	4.2	5.8	17.3

Thuringia

Polling firm	Date	CDU	SPD	Linke	Grüne	FDP	AfD	Other	Lead
2017 election	24 Sep 2017	28.8	13.2	16.9	4.1	7.8	22.7	6.5	6.1
YouGov	22 Sep 2017	31	15	23	4	6	17	5	8
YouGov	19 Sep 2017	31	14	23	4	6	17	7	8
2013 election	22 Sep 2013	38.8	16.1	23.4	4.9	2.6	6.2	8.0	15.3

== Subnational polling ==
=== By state ===
Poll source	End date	CDU/CSU	SPD	Die Linke	Grünen	FDP	AfD	Other	Lead
Baden-Württemberg
Infratest dimap	5 September 2017	42	17	6	12	9	11	3	25
Infratest dimap	4 July 2017	43	19	4	14	9	8	3	24
Forsa	11 December 2015	43	18	6	14	6	9	4	25
Forsa	7 May 2015	46	18	5	13	6	6	6	28
Last election	22 September 2013	45.7	20.6	4.8	11.0	6.2	5.2	6.5	25.1
Bavaria
GMS	20 September 2017	47	18	4	7	8	9	7	29
GMS	6 September 2017	48	19	3	7	9	8	6	29
Infratest dimap	4 September 2017	47	17	5	9	7	8	7	30
GMS	15 August 2017	48	19	3	8	9	6	7	29
GMS	5 July 2017	49	20	3	8	7	7	6	29
GMS	31 May 2017	47	20	4	7	8	8	6	27
Infratest dimap	29 May 2017	48	18	4	8	10	7	5	30
GMS	3 May 2017	44	23	4	7	6	9	7	21
GMS	22 March 2017	45	22	4	8	6	9	6	23
GMS	8 February 2017	44	20	4	10	6	10	6	24
Kantar Public	1 February 2017	42	22	4	9	6	12	5	20
GMS	3 January 2017	46	17	4	10	6	10	7	29
Forsa	15 July 2016	44	16	5	13	6	9	7	28
Forsa	3 June 2016	41	15	6	13	6	12	7	28
GMS	3 January 2016	45	20	3	11	4	9	8	25
Forsa	2 October 2015	44	18	5	10	5	9	9	26
Forsa	31 March 2015	50	18	4	10	5	6	7	32
GMS	3 December 2014	50	20	4	9	3	6	2	30
Last election	22 September 2013	49.3	20.0	3.8	8.4	5.1	4.3	9.1	25.1
Berlin
Infratest dimap	9 September 2017	26	19	18	11	7	12	7	7
Forsa	30 August 2017	26	23	16	10	11	9	5	3
Forsa	27 July 2017	31	22	16	11	7	7	6	9
Forsa	29 June 2017	30	22	16	11	8	7	6	8
Forsa	24 May 2017	29	24	15	10	8	7	7	5
Infratest dimap	20 May 2017	29	22	16	11	8	10	4	7
Forsa	27 April 2017	25	28	16	9	6	8	8	3
Forsa	30 March 2017	25	28	15	10	6	8	8	3
Forsa	23 February 2017	21	30	15	10	6	10	8	9
Forsa	26 January 2017	26	20	15	14	6	13	6	6
Forsa	23 December 2016	25	21	16	14	5	14	5	4
Forsa	24 November 2016	25	21	16	14	5	14	5	4
Forsa	27 October 2016	24	21	17	15	5	12	6	3
Forsa	28 July 2016	24	21	17	17	6	9	6	3
Forsa	30 June 2016	24	21	17	16	7	9	6	3
Forsa	25 May 2016	23	20	18	17	7	9	6	3
Forsa	28 April 2016	24	21	19	16	7	8	5	3
Forsa	23 March 2016	25	19	18	15	7	11	5	6
Forsa	25 February 2016	26	23	17	13	5	9	7	3
Forsa	28 January 2016	25	23	18	14	4	10	6	2
Forsa	17 December 2015	29	21	19	12	4	8	7	8
Forsa	26 November 2015	29	22	19	14	4	6	6	7
Forsa	29 October 2015	27	24	21	12	5	6	5	3
Forsa	24 September 2015	29	24	19	14	4	4	6	5
Forsa	1 September 2015	28	24	20	14	4	3	7	4
Forsa	5 August 2015	30	24	20	13	4	3	6	6
Forsa	24 June 2015	28	23	20	14	5	4	6	5
Forsa	28 May 2015	28	23	20	14	6	4	6	5
Forsa	29 April 2015	30	23	19	14	4	4	6	7
Forsa	26 March 2015	30	24	18	14	4	4	6	6
Forsa	26 February 2015	30	24	17	15	4	4	6	6
Forsa	29 January 2015	31	21	19	14	3	5	7	10
Forsa	27 November 2014	31	23	17	15	2	5	7	8
Forsa	1 November 2014	29	23	19	15	2	6	6	6
Forsa	18 September 2014	29	22	19	14	2	8	6	7
Forsa	31 July 2014	31	21	18	15	2	5	8	10
Forsa	26 June 2014	29	22	18	14	3	7	7	7
Forsa	28 May 2014	28	21	19	15	2	8	7	7
Forsa	5 May 2014	31	22	19	13	3	5	7	9
Forsa	27 March 2014	32	21	20	12	3	4	8	11
Forsa	5 March 2014	30	22	19	13	4	5	7	8
Forsa	29 January 2014	28	25	18	14	4	4	7	3
Forsa	2 January 2014	28	23	13	4	19	5	8	5
Last election	22 September 2013	28.5	24.6	18.5	12.3	3.6	4.9	7.7	3.9
Brandenburg
Infratest dimap	19 June 2017	35	24	15	5	3	15	3	11
Forsa	13 January 2017	30	19	16	6	5	20	4	10
Forsa	26 September 2016	26	21	17	6	–	21	–	5
Forsa	17 March 2016	28	21	16	8	4	18	–	7
Forsa	17 December 2015	32	22	20	5	3	14	–	10
Emnid	5 March 2014	29	30	23	7	2	4	4	1
Last election	22 September 2013	34.8	23.1	22.4	4.7	2.5	6.0	6.5	11.7
Hamburg
Trend Research	28 August 2017	30	30	11	7	10	7	5	Tie
Trend Research	6 February 2017	24	41	8	6	7	8	4	17
Last election	22 September 2013	32.1	32.4	8.8	12.7	4.8	4.2	5.0	0.3
Hesse
Forsa	26 August 2015	40	26	7	13	5	4	–	10
Last election	22 September 2013	39.2	28.8	6.0	9.9	5.6	5.6	4.9	10.4
Lower Saxony
Infratest dimap	9 August 2017	42	29	4	7	8	6	4	13
Forsa	28 April 2017	36	35	5	7	6	7	4	1
Last election	22 September 2013	41.1	33.1	5.0	8.8	4.2	3.7	4.1	8.0
Mecklenburg-Vorpommern
INSA	14 July 2017	32	21	13	4	5	22	3	10
Forsa	16 January 2017	34	18	15	5	3	19	6	15
Last election	22 September 2013	42.5	17.8	21.5	4.3	2.2	5.6	5.9	21.0
North Rhine-Westphalia
YouGov	8 September 2017	36	30	9	6	7	9	3	6
Infratest dimap	31 August 2017	36	26	8	7	12	8	3	10
Forsa	10 March 2017	33	35	5	6	9	7	5	2
Forsa	20 January 2017	37	27	7	9	7	8	5	10
Forsa	27 November 2015	37	30	6	9	6	6	6	7
Forsa	28 May 2015	39	29	7	10	7	3	5	10
Last election	22 September 2013	39.8	31.9	6.1	8.0	5.2	3.9	5.0	7.9
Rhineland-Palatinate
Infratest dimap	11 September 2017	39	25	6	7	8	11	4	14
Infratest dimap	19 June 2017	44	24	6	6	10	7	3	20
Infratest dimap	6 March 2017	40	37	4	4	6	6	3	3
Last election	22 September 2013	43.3	27.5	5.4	7.6	5.5	4.8	5.8	15.8
Saarland
INSA	6 March 2017	32	44	4	5	6	7	2	12
Last election	22 September 2013	37.8	31.0	10.0	5.7	3.8	5.2	6.5	6.8
Saxony
Infratest dimap	17 June 2017	46	11	14	3	5	18	3	28
Infratest dimap	19 November 2016	38	14	15	7	–	20	6	18
INSA	23 September 2016	32	15	16	5	3	25	4	7
Last election	22 September 2013	42.6	14.6	20.0	4.9	3.1	6.8	8.0	22.6
Saxony-Anhalt
Infratest dimap	17 June 2017	45	14	17	4	6	11	3	28
Infratest dimap	19 November 2016	39	16	17	4	3	16	5	22
Last election	22 September 2013	41.2	18.2	23.9	4.0	2.6	4.2	5.8	17.3
Thuringia
INSA	28 July 2017	39	14	18	4	5	18	2	21
Infratest dimap	20 June 2017	43	12	20	4	5	12	4	23
INSA	11 April 2017	35	20	17	4	5	15	4	15
Infratest dimap	19 November 2016	37	13	18	7	3	19	3	18
INSA	12 April 2016	32	13	17	10.5	6.5	18	–	14
Emnid	23 October 2013	42	16	23	5	2	6	6	19
Last election	22 September 2013	38.8	16.1	23.4	4.9	2.6	6.2	9.0	15.4

=== West Germany ===
Poll source	End date	CDU/CSU	SPD	Die Linke	Grünen	FDP	AfD	Other	Lead
Emnid	6 September 2017	38	25	7	9	9	7	5	13
Infratest dimap	1 September 2016	34	24	7	12	6	12	5	10
Infratest dimap	26 August 2016	34	24	7	13	6	11	5	10
Infratest dimap	4 August 2016	35	22	7	14	6	11	5	13
Infratest dimap	15 July 2016	35	23	6	15	6	10	5	12
Infratest dimap	7 July 2016	35	23	7	14	6	11	4	12
Infratest dimap	17 June 2016	31	22	7	16	7	13	4	9
Infratest dimap	2 June 2016	32	22	7	14	7	14	4	10
Infratest dimap	20 May 2016	32	22	7	13	8	14	4	10
Infratest dimap	4 May 2016	33	21	6	14	7	14	5	12
Infratest dimap	22 April 2016	34	22	6	13	8	13	4	12
Infratest dimap	7 April 2016	35	22	5	14	7	13	4	13
Infratest dimap	24 March 2016	35	22	5	14	7	13	4	13
Infratest dimap	29 February 2016	36	24	6	12	6	11	5	12
Infratest dimap	26 February 2016	37	24	6	12	6	10	5	13
Infratest dimap	3 February 2016	35	25	7	11	6	11	5	10
Infratest dimap	15 January 2016	38	26	6	11	4	9	6	12
Infratest dimap	7 January 2016	40	25	5	12	4	9	5	15
Infratest dimap	18 December 2015	40	25	5	11	4	9	6	15
Infratest dimap	3 December 2015	38	26	5	12	5	9	5	12
Infratest dimap	20 November 2015	38	26	6	11	5	8	6	12
Infratest dimap	5 November 2015	38	25	7	12	5	7	6	13
Infratest dimap	23 October 2015	39	25	6	13	6	7	4	14
Infratest dimap	1 October 2015	41	25	6	11	5	6	6	16
Infratest dimap	11 September 2015	43	27	6	12	4	3	5	16
Infratest dimap	3 September 2015	43	25	6	13	4	3	6	18
Infratest dimap	14 August 2015	44	25	6	12	4	4	5	19
Infratest dimap	30 July 2015	44	24	6	12	5	4	5	20
Infratest dimap	17 July 2015	43	25	6	11	6	4	5	18
Infratest dimap	2 July 2015	41	26	7	12	6	5	3	15
Infratest dimap	19 June 2015	42	25	7	11	6	5	4	17
Infratest dimap	3 June 2015	42	26	6	11	6	4	5	16
Infratest dimap	21 May 2015	42	27	6	10	5	5	5	15
Infratest dimap	7 May 2015	41	26	6	11	4	6	6	15
Infratest dimap	24 April 2015	42	25	5	12	4	6	6	17
Infratest dimap	2 April 2015	42	26	6	11	4	6	5	16
Infratest dimap	13 March 2015	42	25	5	12	5	6	5	17
Infratest dimap	5 March 2015	42	26	6	11	4	6	5	16
Infratest dimap	13 February 2015	43	25	5	11	3	7	6	18
Infratest dimap	5 February 2015	42	26	6	11	4	5	6	16
Infratest dimap	16 January 2015	42	26	5	12	4	5	6	16
Infratest dimap	8 January 2015	42	27	5	11	4	5	6	15
Infratest dimap	19 December 2014	43	26	5	11	–	6	9	17
Infratest dimap	4 December 2014	41	27	6	12	2	7	5	14
Infratest dimap	21 November 2014	42	27	5	12	3	6	5	15
Infratest dimap	6 November 2014	43	26	6	11	3	6	5	17
Infratest dimap	24 October 2014	42	27	5	11	2	7	6	15
Infratest dimap	2 October 2014	43	25	6	10	2	9	5	18
Infratest dimap	26 September 2014	41	26	6	11	3	8	5	15
Infratest dimap	4 September 2014	42	25	7	11	3	7	5	17
Infratest dimap	29 August 2014	44	26	6	10	3	5	6	18
Infratest dimap	7 August 2014	42	27	6	11	3	5	6	15
Infratest dimap	18 July 2014	41	27	7	11	4	4	6	14
Infratest dimap	3 July 2014	40	27	6	12	4	5	6	13
Infratest dimap	20 June 2014	40	26	5	13	4	6	6	14
Infratest dimap	5 June 2014	39	28	6	12	4	6	5	11
Infratest dimap	16 May 2014	40	27	6	12	4	6	5	13
Infratest dimap	30 April 2014	41	27	6	11	4	5	6	14
Infratest dimap	25 April 2014	42	26	6	11	5	5	5	16
Infratest dimap	3 April 2014	42	27	5	11	5	5	5	15
Infratest dimap	28 March 2014	42	26	5	11	4	5	7	16
Infratest dimap	6 March 2014	43	25	6	12	5	4	5	18
Infratest dimap	28 February 2014	41	27	6	11	5	5	5	14
Infratest dimap	6 February 2014	42	28	6	10	5	4	5	14
Infratest dimap	31 January 2014	43	28	5	10	5	3	6	15
Infratest dimap	9 January 2014	42	28	4	10	5	4	7	14
Infratest dimap	20 December 2013	43	29	5	10	4	3	6	14
Infratest dimap	5 December 2013	44	27	5	11	3	4	6	17
Infratest dimap	22 November 2013	43	26	6	11	3	4	7	17
Infratest dimap	7 November 2013	43	27	6	11	3	4	6	16
Infratest dimap	25 October 2013	41	28	6	10	4	5	6	13
Infratest dimap	10 October 2013	43	27	6	9	3	4	8	16
Last election	22 September 2013	42.2	27.4	5.6	9.2	5.2	4.5	6.0	14.8

=== East Germany ===
Poll source	End date	CDU/CSU	SPD	Die Linke	Grünen	FDP	AfD	Other	Lead
Emnid	6 September 2017	31	20	20	5	4	16	4	11
Emnid	2 February 2017	27	24	17	–	–	–	–	3
Emnid	25 January 2017	32	17	17	–	–	–	–	15
Infratest dimap	1 September 2016	27	18	18	7	3	21	6	6
Infratest dimap	26 August 2016	29	17	18	7	2	21	6	8
Infratest dimap	5 August 2016	29	19	18	7	3	20	4	9
Infratest dimap	15 July 2016	28	19	18	7	3	20	5	8
Infratest dimap	7 July 2016	30	18	18	7	4	19	4	11
Infratest dimap	17 June 2016	30	17	18	7	5	19	4	11
Infratest dimap	2 June 2016	30	16	17	8	4	21	4	9
Infratest dimap	20 May 2016	30	16	17	7	5	21	4	9
Infratest dimap	4 May 2016	30	16	17	7	4	21	5	9
Infratest dimap	22 April 2016	30	17	16	5	5	20	6	10
Infratest dimap	7 April 2016	30	18	16	6	5	19	6	11
Infratest dimap	24 March 2016	30	18	17	6	5	17	7	12
Infratest dimap	29 February 2016	33	18	20	5	3	14	7	13
Infratest dimap	26 February 2016	33	19	18	6	4	13	7	14
Infratest dimap	3 February 2016	32	18	18	6	3	16	7	14
Infratest dimap	15 January 2016	32	19	19	5	4	13	8	13
Infratest dimap	7 January 2016	33	20	20	6	4	11	6	13
Infratest dimap	18 December 2015	30	21	20	5	3	13	8	9
Infratest dimap	3 December 2015	31	21	20	5	2	13	8	10
Infratest dimap	20 November 2015	33	20	19	5	3	12	8	13
Infratest dimap	5 November 2015	33	19	19	5	3	12	9	14
Infratest dimap	23 October 2015	34	19	20	5	3	11	8	14
Infratest dimap	1 October 2015	36	20	20	5	3	8	8	16
Infratest dimap	11 September 2015	37	21	20	7	3	5	7	16
Infratest dimap	3 September 2015	38	22	18	7	3	5	7	16
Infratest dimap	14 August 2015	36	20	21	7	4	5	7	15
Infratest dimap	30 July 2015	36	20	21	7	4	6	6	15
Infratest dimap	17 July 2015	35	22	20	8	4	6	5	13
Infratest dimap	2 July 2015	34	21	23	7	3	6	6	11
Infratest dimap	19 June 2015	32	22	23	7	3	6	7	9
Infratest dimap	3 June 2015	35	21	21	7	4	7	6	14
Infratest dimap	21 May 2015	37	22	20	7	3	7	5	15
Infratest dimap	7 May 2015	36	20	22	7	2	7	6	14
Infratest dimap	24 April 2015	35	21	21	7	2	8	6	14
Infratest dimap	2 April 2015	36	21	22	6	2	7	6	14
Infratest dimap	13 March 2015	36	21	23	6	3	6	5	13
Infratest dimap	5 March 2015	36	20	21	6	2	8	7	15
Infratest dimap	13 February 2015	38	19	20	5	2	8	8	18
Infratest dimap	5 February 2015	37	19	21	6	2	8	7	16
Infratest dimap	16 January 2015	38	20	21	5	3	7	6	17
Infratest dimap	8 January 2015	37	20	22	6	2	7	6	15
Infratest dimap	19 December 2014	37	21	21	6	–	6	9	16
Infratest dimap	4 December 2014	33	23	21	7	2	8	6	10
Infratest dimap	21 November 2014	35	23	21	7	2	7	5	12
Infratest dimap	6 November 2014	34	22	21	7	1	8	7	12
Infratest dimap	24 October 2014	33	22	23	6	2	8	6	10
Infratest dimap	2 October 2014	34	20	22	5	2	10	7	12
Infratest dimap	26 September 2014	33	20	22	6	2	10	7	11
Infratest dimap	4 September 2014	35	20	22	6	3	7	7	13
Infratest dimap	29 August 2014	36	22	20	5	3	8	6	14
Infratest dimap	7 August 2014	37	22	22	5	3	5	6	15
Infratest dimap	18 July 2014	35	22	24	6	2	5	6	12
Infratest dimap	3 July 2014	35	21	22	7	3	6	6	13
Infratest dimap	20 June 2014	35	20	21	8	2	7	7	14
Infratest dimap	5 June 2014	34	20	21	8	2	8	7	13
Infratest dimap	16 May 2014	35	22	21	7	2	6	7	13
Infratest dimap	30 April 2014	34	22	23	6	3	5	7	11
Infratest dimap	25 April 2014	34	22	24	6	3	5	6	10
Infratest dimap	3 April 2014	35	22	22	6	2	6	7	13
Infratest dimap	28 March 2014	36	21	20	6	3	6	8	15
Infratest dimap	6 March 2014	38	20	21	7	2	5	7	17
Infratest dimap	28 February 2014	36	21	21	6	3	5	8	15
Infratest dimap	6 February 2014	38	21	22	6	2	6	5	16
Infratest dimap	31 January 2014	39	21	20	6	3	5	6	18
Infratest dimap	9 January 2014	39	20	21	7	2	5	6	18
Infratest dimap	20 December 2013	40	21	20	6	2	5	6	19
Infratest dimap	5 December 2013	38	19	23	7	2	4	7	15
Infratest dimap	22 November 2013	37	20	22	7	2	3	9	15
Infratest dimap	7 November 2013	35	21	23	6	3	4	8	12
Infratest dimap	25 October 2013	35	20	22	6	4	6	7	15
Infratest dimap	10 October 2013	39	20	21	6	2	6	6	18
Last election	22 September 2013	38.5	17.9	22.7	5.1	2.7	5.9	7.2	20.6

== See also ==
- Opinion polling for the 2021 German federal election
- Opinion polling for the German federal election, 2013
