= Chamberlain's approach to unobserved effects models =

Statistical tool

In linear panel analysis, it can be desirable to estimate the magnitude of the fixed effects, as they provide measures of the unobserved components. For instance, in wage equation regressions, fixed effects capture unobservables that are constant over time, such as motivation. Chamberlain's approach to unobserved effects models is a way of estimating the linear unobserved effects, under fixed effect (rather than random effects) assumptions, in the following unobserved effects model

$$y_{it} = x_{it} b + c_i + u_{it}$$

where c_{i} is the unobserved effect and x_{it} contains only time-varying explanatory variables. Rather than differencing out the unobserved effect c_{i}, Chamberlain proposed to replace it with the linear projection of it onto the explanatory variables in all time periods. Specifically, this leads to the following equation

$$c_i = d + x_{i1} \lambda_1 + x_{i2} \lambda_2 + \dots + x_{iT} \lambda_T + e_i$$

where the conditional distribution of c_{i} given x_{it} is unspecified, as is standard in fixed effects models. Combining these equations then gives rise to the following model.

$$y_{it} = d + x_{i1} \lambda_1 + \dots + x_{it} (b + \lambda_t) + \dots + x_{iT} \lambda_T + e_i + u_{it}$$

An important advantage of this approach is the computational requirement. Chamberlain uses minimum distance estimation, but a generalized method of moments approach would be another valid way of estimating this model. The latter approach also gives rise to a larger number of instruments than moment conditions, which leads to useful overidentifying restrictions that can be used to test the strict exogeneity restrictions imposed by many static Fixed Effects models.

Similar approaches have been proposed to model the unobserved effect. For instance, Mundlak follows a very similar approach, but rather projects the unobserved effect c_{i} onto the average of all x_{it} across all T time periods, more specifically

$$c_i = d + \overline{x}_i \lambda + e_i$$

It can be shown that the Chamberlain method is a generalization of Mundlak's model. The Chamberlain method has been popular in empirical work, ranging from studies trying to estimate the causal returns to union membership, to studies investigating growth convergence, and estimating product characteristics in demand estimation.
