= Michael Keane (economist) =

American/Australian economist (born 1961)

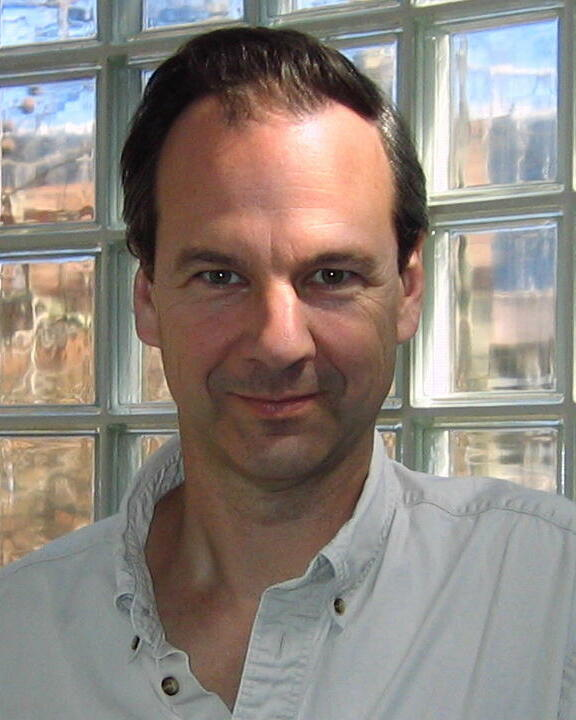
- Michael Keane at UTS in 2008
- Born: January 12, 1961 (age 65); Suffern, New York

Academic background
- Education: MIT; Brown University
- Doctoral advisor: Robert A. Moffitt
- Influences: Kenneth Wolpin; John Geweke; James Heckman

Academic work
- Discipline: Econometrics
- Institutions: Johns Hopkins University
- Notable ideas: Choice Modelling, Structural Modelling, Simulation Methods, Panel Data Econometrics
- Awards: Fellow of the Econometric Society; Ken Arrow Award; John Little Award; Australian Laureate Fellowship (2011)
- Website: Information at IDEAS / RePEc

Michael Patrick Keane (born 1961) is an American-born economist; he is the Wm. Polk Carey Distinguished Professor at Johns Hopkins University. Keane was previously a professor at the University of New South Wales and the Nuffield Professor of Economics at the University of Oxford. He is considered one of the world's leading experts in the fields of Choice Modelling, structural modelling, simulation estimation, and panel data econometrics.

He is also one of the world's leading economists by many measures of research productivity. Keane works in numerous areas including labor economics, econometrics, consumer demand models, marketing, industrial organization, health economics, and trade.

He is currently a chief investigator of the Australian Research Council Centre of Excellence in Population Ageing Research (Cepar). From 2006 to 2010 he was co-director of the Centre for the Study of Choice (CenSoC) at UTS. Keane became a dual citizen of Australia in 2010.

== Education and career ==
Keane was born in Suffern, New York, United States in 1961. He graduated from Xavier High School in Manhattan in 1979. Keane received a B.S. degree from the Massachusetts Institute of Technology in 1983, where he was known as "Peachy" and played the bass guitar. He received a Ph.D. from Brown University in 1990.

In 1993, he became a tenured associate professor at the University of Minnesota, and was promoted to full professor in 1996. He subsequently held full professor positions at New York University (1998–2001) and Yale University (2000–2006).

In 2006, he moved to Australia to take up an Australian Federation Fellowship at the University of Technology Sydney. In 2011, he became an Australian Laureate Fellow at the University of New South Wales.

Keane was elected a Fellow of the Econometric Society (2005), to the Council of the Econometric Society (2009), and a Fellow of the Academy of Social Sciences in Australia (2012). He was the recipient of the John D.C. Little award for the Best Paper in Marketing (1996) and the Kenneth J. Arrow Award for Best Paper in Health Economics (2008). In 2004–05, Keane was the Goldwater Chair of American Institutions at Arizona State University and, subsequently, has been a regular visiting professor there.

== Contributions ==
Keane's work is notable for the fact that it spans a very wide range of substantive and methodological areas. He is best known for work on the following topics:

=== Discrete choice models ===
Keane's work on recursive importance sampling (the "GHK" algorithm), contained in his thesis (1990) and published in 1993–1994, made it feasible to estimate a much larger class of discrete choice models than was previously possible. In particular, his thesis developed a fast algorithm for the highly accurate calculation of areas of polyhedrons in very-high-dimensional spaces. While primarily a result in applied mathematics, this result is very useful in economics (and other social sciences) because the choice probabilities in discrete choice models generally have this form. The GHK algorithm is now included in many popular econometrics software packages, including SAS, Stata, GAUSSX, Matlab and R-Cran-Bayesm, and is a standard topic in graduate econometrics texts.

=== Consumer demand and marketing ===
A 1996 paper with Tulin Erdem in Marketing Science presented what is now the main economic model of advertising and consumer learning. This paper received the John D.C. Little Award for the Best Paper in Marketing in 1996, and it has had a major impact on the fields of marketing and industrial organization. There is now a large literature on consumer learning based on the Erdem-Keane framework. Erdem and Keane (among others) have argued that their framework can provide an economic explanation for the phenomenon known as brand equity, based on incomplete information and risk aversion. The November 2013 issue of Marketing Science contains an extensive review of the large literature based on the Erdem-Keane framework.

=== Dynamic life-cycle models ===
In a series of joint papers with Kenneth Wolpin, published between 1994 and 2010, Keane developed a major line of research on dynamic life-cycle models of career (i.e., school and work) choices. This line of research is notable both for the methodological contributions on how to estimate these types of models, and for its substantive economic contributions. Methodologically, their method of approximating the solution to computationally intensive dynamic programming problems led to a great expansion in the class of such models that are feasible to implement empirically (i.e., their method made it possible to estimate models with many more choices and state variables than was possible previously). Substantively, their seminal 1997 paper on "The Career Decisions on Young Men" presented the so-called "90 percent result"—i.e., that most of what matters for lifetime earnings has already happened by age 16. This result helped to shift the focus of the human capital literature away from college education and towards early childhood education. This is now a very active area of research in economics, which has been pursued by both Keane and Wolpin and, quite notably, by the Nobel Prize–winning economist James Heckman, among others.

=== Welfare and transfer programs ===
His 1998 paper with Robert Moffitt, entitled "Multiple welfare program participation and labor supply," has had great influence on subsequent models of transfer/welfare programs. This was the first paper to account for the very complex budget constraints created when people may participate in several government welfare programs simultaneously. The model predicted that welfare caseloads would drop substantially in response to earnings subsidies (like the Earned Income Tax Credit).

=== Human capital and labor supply ===
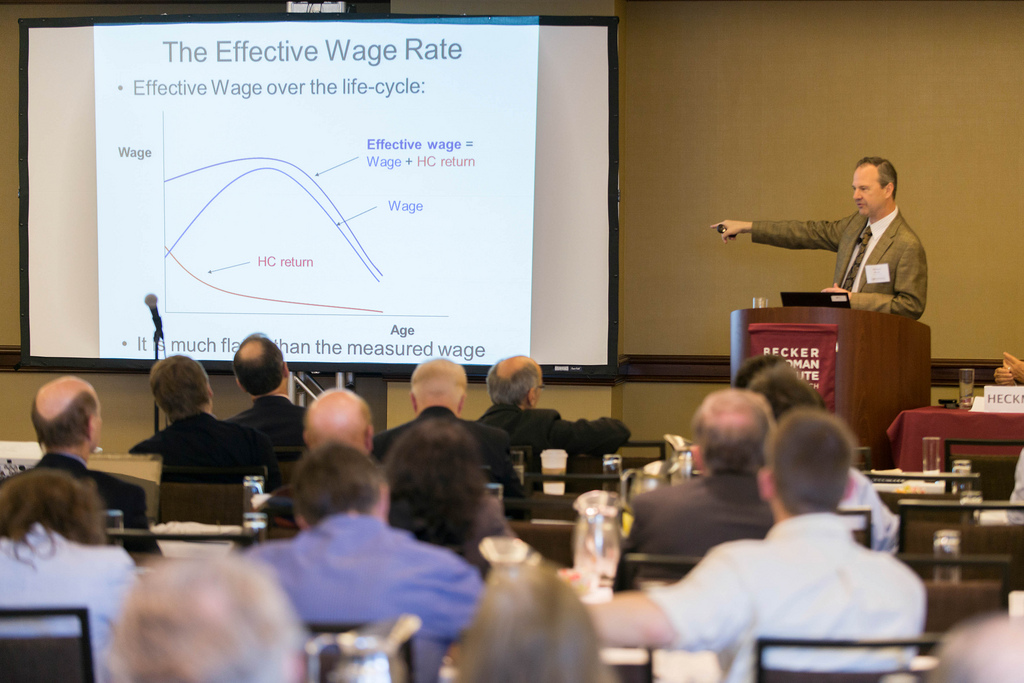
Michael Keane at the Becker-Friedman Institute, 2013

In recent years, Keane has argued persuasively that, due to human capital effects, labor supply elasticities are much larger than the previous consensus of the economics profession would suggest. These views are presented in Imai and Keane (2004), Keane (2010) and Keane and Rogerson (2012). If correct, his views imply that welfare losses from income taxation are much higher than was previously thought. Recently, Keane gave a keynote lecture summarizing this work at the 2015 annual meeting of the Royal Economic Society. His Cowles lecture at the 2011 summer meeting of the Econometric Society also dealt with this topic.

=== Modelling expectations ===
Keane's papers with David Runkle (1990, 1998) are considered fundamental contributions in the literature on how people form expectations. These papers showed that the widespread empirical failure of "rational expectations" was in fact due to a set of econometric and data problems (such as the failure to account for aggregate economic shocks and the effects of data revisions).

=== Panel data econometrics ===
The recursive importance sampling algorithm developed in Keane's 1994 Econometrica paper made it possible to estimate panel data discrete choice models with complex serial correlation patterns. This approach is now widely used to model discrete dynamic processes in marketing and labor economics. Keane's 1992 Journal of Business and Economic Statistics paper with David Runkle developed a new approach for estimating linear panel data models in cases where the available instruments are predetermined but not strictly exogenous. This is a very common case that includes all dynamic panel data models as a leading example. Chamberlain (1982) noted that the Keane-Runkle approach was not fully efficient because it fails to use all available instruments. Keane and Runkle (1992) responded that the use of additional instruments would be unwise as it would generate bias due to the "many instrument problem." Nevertheless, the development of more efficient panel data estimators based on more instruments became a major research program in the 90s. Examples of this line of research are well-known papers by Arellano-Bond (1991), Ahn-Schmidt (1995), Arellano-Bover (1995) and Blundell-Bond (1998). For a review of the literature see Baltagi (2005) chapter 8. More recent work, such as Ziliak (1997), supports Keane and Runkle (1992)'s original argument that use of additional instruments may cause severe bias.

=== Econometric methodology ===
Keane is well known as a champion of the "structural econometrics" school, which emphasizes the important role of economic theory in empirical work. This contrasts with the "experimental school" which has become very popular in the last 20 years. The latter seeks to use "natural experiments" to substitute for economic theory. He has written a number of articles on the importance of theory and the limitations of experiments (see Keane 2010a, 2010b).

=== Other areas ===
In addition, Keane has done significant work in many other areas, such as health economics, child development, international trade, political economy, experimental economics, and development economics.

== Selected papers ==
- Testing the rationality of price forecasts: New evidence from panel data, (with David Runkle), American Economic Review, 80:4, (1990), 714–35.
- On the Estimation of Panel Data Models with Serial Correlation when Instruments are Predetermined but not Strictly Exogenous, (with David Runkle), Journal of Business and Economic Statistics, 10:1, (1992), 1–9.
- Simulation Estimation for Panel Data Models with Limited Dependent Variables, in The Handbook of Statistics, G.S. Maddala, C. R. Rao and H.D. Vinod editors, North Holland publisher (1993).
- A Computationally Practical Simulation Estimator for Panel Data, Econometrica, 62:1, (1994), 95–116.
- The Solution and Estimation of Discrete Choice Dynamic Programming Models by Simulation: Monte Carlo Evidence, (with Kenneth Wolpin), Review of Economics and Statistics, 76:4, (1994), 648–72.
- Decision Making under Uncertainty: Capturing Dynamic Brand Choice Processes in Turbulent Consumer Goods Markets (with Tulin Erdem), Marketing Science, 15:1, (1996), 1–20.
- The Career Decisions of Young Men, (with Kenneth Wolpin), Journal of Political Economy, 105:3, (1997), 473–522.
- A Structural Model of Multiple Welfare Program Participation and Labor Supply, (with Robert A. Moffitt), International Economic Review, 39:3, (1998), 553–89.
- Are Financial Analysts' Forecasts of Corporate Profits Rational? (with David Runkle), Journal of Political Economy, 106:4, (1998), 768–805.
- A Model of Health Plan Choice: Inferring Preferences and Perceptions from a Combination of Revealed Preference and Attitudinal Data, (with Katherine Harris), Journal of Econometrics, 89, (1999), 131–57.
- Mixture of Normals Probit Models, (with John Geweke), in Analysis of Panels and Limited Dependent Variable Models, Hsiao, Lahiri, Lee and Pesaran editors, Cambridge University Press, (1999), 49–78.
- Bayesian Inference for Dynamic Discrete Choice Models without the Need for Dynamic Programming, (with John Geweke), in Simulation Based Inference and Econometrics, Mariano, Schuermann and Weeks editors, Cambridge University Press, (1999), 100–31.
- The Effect of Parental Transfers and Borrowing Constraints on Educational Attainment, (with Kenneth Wolpin), International Economic Review, 42:4, (2001), 1051–103.
- Intertemporal Labor Supply and Human Capital Accumulation, (with Susumu Imai), International Economic Review, 45:2, (2004), 601–42.
- Behavior in a Dynamic Decision Problem: An Analysis of Experimental Evidence Using a Bayesian Type Classification Algorithm, (with Daniel Houser and Kevin McCabe), Econometrica, 72:3, (2004), 781–822.
- Accounting for the Growth of MNC-Based Trade using a Structural Model of US MNCs, (with Susan Feinberg), American Economic Review, 96:5, (2006), 1515–58.
- Sources of Advantageous Selection: Evidence from the Medigap Insurance Market, (with Hanming Fang and Dan Silverman), Journal of Political Economy, 116:2 (2008), 303–50.
- Structural vs. Atheoretic Approaches to Econometrics, Journal of Econometrics, 156:1, (2010a), 3–20.
- A Structural Perspective on the Experimentalist School, Journal of Economic Perspectives, 24:2 (2010b), 47–58.
- The Role of Labor and Marriage Markets, Preference Heterogeneity and the Welfare System in the Life-Cycle Decisions of Black, Hispanic and White Women, (with Kenneth Wolpin), International Economic Review, 51:3, (2010), 851–92.
- Child Care Choices and Children’s Cognitive Achievement: The Case of Single Mothers, (with Raquel Bernal), Journal of Labor Economics, 29:3, (2011), 459–512.
- Labor Supply and Taxes: A Survey, Journal of Economic Literature, 49:4, (2011), 961–1075.
- Micro and Macro Labor Supply Elasticities: A Reassessment of the Conventional Wisdom (with Richard Rogerson), Journal of Economic Literature, 50:2, (2012), 464–76.
