= Sargan–Hansen test =

Statistical test

The Sargan–Hansen test or Sargan's $J$ test is a statistical test used for testing over-identifying restrictions in a statistical model. It was proposed by John Denis Sargan in 1958, and several variants were derived by him in 1975. Lars Peter Hansen re-worked through the derivations and showed that it can be extended to general non-linear GMM in a time series context.

The Sargan test is based on the assumption that model parameters are identified via a priori restrictions on the coefficients, and tests the validity of over-identifying restrictions. The test statistic can be computed from residuals from instrumental variables regression by constructing a quadratic form based on the cross-product of the residuals and exogenous variables. Under the null hypothesis that the over-identifying restrictions are valid, the statistic is asymptotically distributed as a chi-square variable with $(m - k)$ degrees of freedom (where $m$ is the number of instruments and $k$ is the number of endogenous variables).

== See also ==
- Durbin–Wu–Hausman test
