= List of presidents of the Econometric Society =

In the scientific discipline of economics, the Econometric Society is a learned society devoted to the advancement of economics by using mathematical and statistical methods. This article is a list of its (past and present) presidents.

== List ==
- 2026: Nobuhiro Kiyotaki
- 2025: Larry Samuelson
- 2024: Eliana La Ferrara
- 2023: Rosa Matzkin
- 2022: Guido Tabellini
- 2021: Pinelopi Koujianou Goldberg
- 2020: Orazio Attanasio
- 2019: Stephen Morris
- 2018: Tim Besley
- 2017: Drew Fudenberg
- 2016: Eddie Dekel
- 2015: Robert Porter
- 2014: Manuel Arellano
- 2013: James J. Heckman
- 2012: Jean-Charles Rochet
- 2011: Bengt R. Holmström
- 2010: John Hardman Moore
- 2009: Roger B. Myerson
- 2008: Torsten Persson
- 2007: Lars Peter Hansen
- 2006: Richard Blundell
- 2005: Thomas J. Sargent
- 2004: Ariel Rubinstein
- 2003: Eric Maskin
- 2002: Guy Laroque
- 2001: Avinash Dixit
- 2000: Elhanan Helpman
- 1999: Robert B. Wilson
- 1998: Jean Tirole
- 1997: Robert E. Lucas, Jr.
- 1996: Roger Guesnerie
- 1995: Christopher Sims
- 1994: Takashi Negishi
- 1993: Andreu Mas-Colell
- 1992: Jean-Jacques Laffont
- 1991: Peter A. Diamond
- 1990: Jean-Michel Grandmont
- 1989: Hugo F. Sonnenschein
- 1988: Anthony B. Atkinson
- 1987: Dale Jorgenson
- 1986: Michael Bruno
- 1985: Daniel McFadden
- 1984: Amartya K. Sen
- 1983: Herbert Scarf
- 1982: James A. Mirrlees
- 1981: Marc Nerlove
- 1980: John D. Sargan
- 1979: Franklin M. Fisher
- 1978: János Kornai
- 1977: Lionel McKenzie
- 1976: Hirofumi Uzawa
- 1975: Zvi Griliches
- 1974: Don Patinkin
- 1973: Roy Radner
- 1972: W. M. Gorman
- 1971: Gérard Debreu
- 1970: Jacques H. Drèze
- 1969: Leonid Hurwicz
- 1968: Frank Hahn
- 1967: Hendrik Houthakker
- 1966: Herman Wold
- 1965: Michio Morishima
- 1964: Robert Solow
- 1963: Edmond Malinvaud
- 1962: Franco Modigliani
- 1961: Henri Theil
- 1960: Lawrence Klein
- 1959: Marcel Boiteux
- 1958: James Tobin
- 1957: Trygve Haavelmo
- 1956: Kenneth Arrow
- 1955: Richard Stone
- 1954: Wassily Leontief
- 1953: René Roy
- 1952: Paul Samuelson
- 1951: R. G. D. Allen
- 1950: Tjalling Koopmans
- 1949: Ragnar Frisch
- 1948: Charles Roos
- 1947: Jan Tinbergen
- 1946: Jacob Marschak
- 1944–1945: John Maynard Keynes
- 1942–1943: Wesley Mitchell
- 1940–1941: Joseph Schumpeter
- 1938–1939: Arthur Bowley
- 1936–1937: Harold Hotelling
- 1935: François Divisia
- 1931–1934: Irving Fisher
