= Fixed-effect Poisson model =

Statistical models used for static panel data

In statistics, a fixed-effect Poisson model is a Poisson regression model used for static panel data when the outcome variable is count data. Hausman, Hall, and Griliches pioneered the method in the mid-1980s. Their outcome of interest was the number of patents filed by firms, where they wanted to develop methods to control for the firm fixed effects. Linear panel data models use the linear additivity of the fixed effects to difference them out and circumvent the incidental parameter problem. Even though Poisson models are inherently nonlinear, the use of the linear index and the exponential link function lead to multiplicative separability, more specifically

E[y_{it} ∨ x_{i1}... x_{iT}, c_{i} ] = m(x_{it}, c_{i}, b_{0} ) = exp(c_{i} + x_{it} b_{0} ) = a_{i} exp(x_{it} b_{0} ) = μ_{ti} (1)

This formula looks very similar to the standard Poisson premultiplied by the term a_{i}. As the conditioning set includes the observables over all periods, we are in the static panel data world and are imposing strict exogeneity. Hausman, Hall, and Griliches then use Andersen's conditional Maximum Likelihood methodology to estimate b_{0}. Using n_{i} = Σ y_{it} allows them to obtain the following nice distributional result of y_{i}

y_{i} ∨ n_{i}, x_{i}, c_{i} ~ Multinomial (n_{i}, p_{1} (x_{i}, b_{0}), ..., p_{T} (x_{i}, b_{0} )) (2) where

$p_t(x_i, b_0) = \frac{m(x_{it}, b_0)}{\sum m(x_{it}, b_0)}. \quad$

At this point, the estimation of the fixed-effect Poisson model is transformed in a useful way and can be estimated by maximum-likelihood estimation techniques for multinomial log likelihoods. This is computationally not necessarily very restrictive, but the distributional assumptions up to this point are fairly stringent. Wooldridge provided evidence that these models have nice robustness properties as long as the conditional mean assumption (i.e. equation 1) holds. Chamberlain also provided semi-parametric efficiency bounds for these estimators under slightly weaker exogeneity assumptions. However, these bounds are practically difficult to attain, as the proposed methodology needs high-dimensional nonparametric regressions for attaining these bounds.

== See also ==
- Partial likelihood methods for panel data § Example: pooled QMLE for Poisson models
