= Steve Bond (economist) =

British economist

Steve Bond is a British economist at Nuffield College, Oxford, Oxford, specialising in applied microeconometrics, particularly the investment and financial behaviour of firms. Together with Manuel Arellano, he developed the Arellano–Bond estimator, a widely used generalized method of moments estimator for panel data.This estimator is based on the earlier article by John Denis Sargan and Alok Bhargava (Bhargava and Sargan, 1983). Research Papers in Economics lists the paper as the most cited article ever in economics.

== Publications ==
- Arellano, M. and Bond, S., 1991. Some tests of specification for panel data: Monte Carlo evidence and an application to employment equations. The review of economic studies, 58(2), pp. 277–297.
- Bhargava, A, and Sargan, JD. (1983), Estimating dynamic random effects models from panel data covering short time periods. Econometrica, 51, 1635–1659.
- Blundell, R. and Bond, S., 1998. Initial conditions and moment restrictions in dynamic panel data models. Journal of econometrics, 87(1), pp. 115–143.
- Bond, S., Hashemi, A., Kaplan, G., and Zoch, P., 2021. Some unpleasant markup arithmetic: Production function elasticities and their estimation from production data. Journal of Monetary Economics, 121, pp. 1–14.
- Bloom, N., Bond, S. and Van Reenen, J., 2007. Uncertainty and investment dynamics. The review of economic studies, 74(2), pp. 391–415.
- Bond, S. and Meghir, C., 1994. Dynamic investment models and the firm's financial policy. The Review of Economic Studies, 61(2), pp. 197–222.
