= Clara Wu Tsai =

American businesswoman and activist (born 1966)

- Tsai in 2026
- Born: Clara Ming-Hua Wu; 1966 (age 59–60); Lawrence, Kansas, U.S.
- Education: Stanford University (BA, MA); Harvard University (MBA)
- Occupation: Businesswoman
- Organization(s): Brooklyn Sports & Entertainment
- Title: Vice Chair
- Spouse: Joseph Tsai (m. 1996; sep. 2026)
- Father: De-Min Wu

Chinese name
- Traditional Chinese: 吳明華
- Simplified Chinese: 吴明华
Transcriptions
Standard Mandarin
- Hanyu Pinyin: Wú Mínghuá
- Bopomofo: ㄨˊ ㄇㄧㄥˊ ㄏㄨㄚˊ
- Wade–Giles: Wu² Ming²-hua²
- Tongyong Pinyin: Wú Mínghuá

Clara Wu Tsai (Chinese: 吳明華; pinyin: Wú Mínghuá; born 1966) is an American businesswoman, philanthropist, and activist. She is a co-owner of the Brooklyn Nets of the National Basketball Association (NBA), the New York Liberty of the Women's National Basketball Association (WNBA), the San Diego Seals of the National Lacrosse League (NLL) and Barclays Center. She is the founder of the Joe and Clara Tsai Foundation, a philanthropic organization; the Social Justice Fund, which focuses on economic mobility and racial justice; the Wu Tsai Human Performance Alliance, which funds health and scientific research; and is a founding partner of REFORM Alliance, a nonprofit focused on prison and parole reform in the United States.

== Early life and education ==
Wu Tsai was born and raised in Lawrence, Kansas, to econometrician De-Min Wu and his wife Chin-Sha Wu, both Taiwanese American immigrants. Her parents had immigrated to the United States from Taiwan on graduate student visas, with her father earning a doctorate in econometrics. Her father taught as a professor at the University of Kansas from 1964 to 1999 and contributed to the development of the Durbin–Wu–Hausman test, a statistical method used in econometrics. Her mother earned a master's degree in mathematics from the University of Wisconsin. Her paternal grandfather, Wu San-lien, was a Taiwanese politician who served as mayor of Taipei.

Wu Tsai was raised alongside her brother, Lawrence Wu. She was raised middle-class, with her parents placing emphasis on her education. After high school, she graduated from Stanford University in 1988 with two degrees: a Bachelor of Arts in international relations and a Master of Arts in policy studies. She then earned a Master of Business Administration (M.B.A.) from Harvard Business School in 1993.

== Business career ==
After graduating from Stanford, Wu Tsai joined Windermere Associates, a San Francisco-based consulting firm founded by a former McKinsey & Company partner. After graduating from Harvard, she moved to New York City, where she worked for The New York Times before joining American Express, where she worked for eight years in New York City, London, and Hong Kong. During her final two years at American Express, she served as vice president of international card partnerships for the Asia-Pacific region. She also served as general manager of the company's U.S. Dollar Card business unit for the Asia-Pacific region.

From 2005 to 2008, Wu Tsai was general manager of the Hong Kong operations of Taobao, an online shopping platform owned by the Alibaba Group. During her tenure, she oversaw the launch of a shopping channel that enabled Hong Kong merchants to market their products to consumers in mainland China. After leaving the general manager position, she continued working with Taobao as an adviser on its international strategy.

=== Sports ownership and management ===
In August 2017, an entity controlled by Wu Tsai's then-husband, businessman Joseph Tsai, received an expansion franchise in the National Lacrosse League (NLL), which was subsequently named the San Diego Seals. Wu Tsai became a co-owner of the franchise, which began competing in the 2018–19 NLL season.

In April 2018, Joseph Tsai completed the acquisition of a 49 percent ownership interest in the Brooklyn Nets of the National Basketball Association (NBA) from Russian businessman Mikhail Prokhorov. In January 2019, Wu Tsai and her husband acquired the New York Liberty of the Women's National Basketball Association (WNBA) from James L. Dolan, whose company had placed the franchise on the market in 2017. The acquisition received unanimous approval from the WNBA and NBA boards of governors on January 23, 2019.

In September 2019, Joseph Tsai completed the acquisition of the remaining ownership interest in the Nets and the team's home arena, Barclays Center, through entities under his control. Wu Tsai became a co-owner of the Nets and became vice chair of Brooklyn Sports & Entertainment, the organization responsible for the teams and Barclays Center. She also serves as governor of the New York Liberty, with responsibility for the franchise's ownership-level leadership.

During Wu Tsai's management, the Liberty relocated from the Westchester County Center in White Plains to Barclays Center in Brooklyn, returning the franchise to New York City. She participated in the Liberty's efforts to recruit prominent players, including Breanna Stewart, Jonquel Jones, and Sabrina Ionescu. In January 2023, she traveled to Turkey to personally recruit Stewart, who was playing overseas during the WNBA offseason. On October 20, 2024, the Liberty won their first WNBA championship, defeating the Minnesota Lynx 67–62 in Game 5 of the 2024 WNBA Finals. By the conclusion of the 2024 season, attendance at Liberty games had increased by approximately 470 percent compared with the period when the Tsais acquired the franchise.

In March 2025, Wu Tsai announced plans for an $80 million, 75,000-square-foot training facility for the Liberty in Greenpoint, Brooklyn, with an anticipated opening in 2027.

=== Film production ===
Wu Tsai was an executive producer of Into the Okavango (2018), a National Geographic documentary directed by Neil Gelinas about efforts to protect the Okavango Delta river basin in southern Africa. She was also an executive producer of Blue Bayou (2021), a drama directed by Justin Chon examining the experiences of an adoptee facing deportation from the United States.

In 2022, Wu Tsai was an executive producer of Unfinished Business, a documentary directed by Alison Klayman chronicling the history of the WNBA and the New York Liberty's 2021 season. She also received an executive producer credit for Lucky Lu (2025), a drama directed by Lloyd Lee Choi that premiered at the 2025 Cannes Film Festival.

Wu Tsai founded Providence Road Entertainment, a film production company focused on developing and producing narrative projects. She was an executive producer of Bedford Park (2026), which received the Special Jury Award for Debut Feature at the 2026 Sundance Film Festival. She also produced Bucking Fastard (2026), a drama directed by Werner Herzog and starring Kate Mara and Rooney Mara, which premiered at the 83rd Venice International Film Festival.

== Board memberships ==
In 2018, Wu Tsai joined the advisory board of the University of Washington's Institute for Protein Design, which conducts research on protein engineering and its applications. She has also served on advisory councils associated with Stanford University's interdisciplinary biological research programs, including Stanford Bio-X and the Wu Tsai Neurosciences Institute.

On December 1, 2021, Wu Tsai began a five-year term as a member of the Stanford University Board of Trustees. She has additionally served on the boards of trustees of NewYork-Presbyterian Hospital and Lincoln Center for the Performing Arts.

In January 2019, Wu Tsai was among the founding partners of REFORM Alliance, an organization established to advocate for changes to the United States criminal justice system, particularly probation and parole policies.

== Philanthropy ==
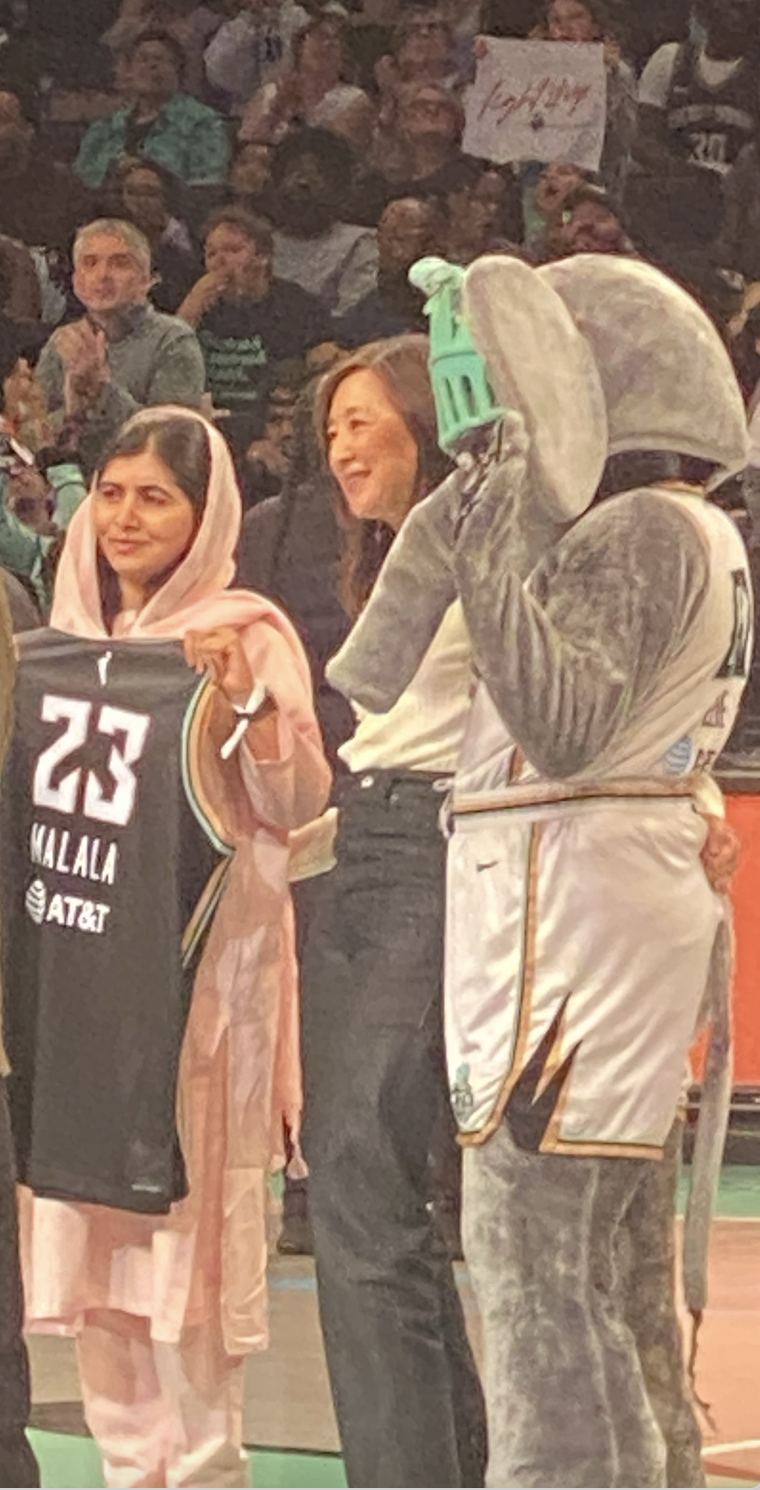
Clara Wu Tsai with Malala Yousafzai and Ellie The Elephant at a NY Liberty Game in 2023

Wu Tsai and her husband started a foundation, the Joe and Clara Tsai Foundation. Wu Tsai leads and manages the foundation's work in supporting scientific research, economic mobility, social justice, and creativity in the arts. The Stanford University neuroscience institute is named after Wu Tsai.

In 2018, Stanford University announced a gift from the Tsais, in support of the Stanford Neurosciences Institute, as part of a $250 million campaign.

In August 2020, in the wake of the George Floyd protests, Wu Tsai and her husband launched the Social Justice Fund in Brooklyn with a $50 million commitment. The fund invests in programs that address the root causes of the borough's racial disparities in education, health, and wealth. Initiatives included BK-XL, a tech accelerator focused on founders in the black, indigenous, and other people of color (BIPOC) communities; the EXCELerate Loan Fund, which provides low-interest loans to BIPOC business owners; and Basquiat in Brooklyn Schools, an educational arts program about Brooklyn-born artist Jean-Michel Basquiat in partnership with the New York City Department of Education.

Wu Tsai and her husband donated to Yale University to establish the Wu Tsai Institute in 2021. The Institute has three centers: the Center for Neurodevelopment and Plasticity, the Center for Neurocognition and Behavior, and the Center for Neurocomputation and Machine Intelligence.

In March 2021, the Joe and Clara Tsai Foundation also donated to the University of California, San Diego's 21st Century China Center to expand its data-based research, policy engagement, and education on issues related to U.S.-China relations.

In July 2021, the Tsais pledged $220 million to create the Wu Tsai Human Performance Alliance, a consortium of experts and academics from Stanford University, the University of Kansas, the University of Oregon, the University of California, San Diego, Boston Children's Hospital, and the Salk Institute for Biological Studies.

In July 2021, the Joe and Clara Tsai Foundation funded a Jean-Michel Basquiat educational arts program developed in partnership between the Brooklyn Nets, the New York City Department of Education and the Fund for Public Schools, with an exhibit hosted in August 2021.

In 2022, the Tsais donated $50 million to the renovation of Lincoln Center's David Geffen Hall, home of the New York Philharmonic. The hall reopened in October 2022, with the theater where the Philharmonic performs renamed as the Wu Tsai Theater. As part of the gift, Lincoln Center and the Philharmonic programmed an annual "Wu Tsai Series" featuring performances meant to reach new audiences and celebrate diverse artists.

== Awards ==
In February 2021, Wu Tsai was named "Champion of Justice" by John Jay College for her role in creating and forming REFORM Alliance. The award also recognized her $50 million donation to create the Social Justice Fund for Brooklyn's Black, Indigenous, and People of Color. In 2022, Wu Tsai and her husband received the Jacqueline Kennedy Onassis Medal from the Municipal Art Society. In May 2023, Wu Tsai was honored by the Gordan Parks Foundation.

In February 2024, Wu Tsai was presented with the Dreamer Award during the first-quarter break of a game between the Nets and the Boston Celtics. The award, which honors those who "embody" Martin Luther King Jr.'s "vision of service," was given by King Jr.'s family members Martin Luther King III and Andrea Waters King, via their Realizing the Dream organization.

In October 2025, Forbes names Wu Tsai in a list of the most powerful women in sports. In June 2026, Time Magazine Names Wu Tsai in a list of The 100 Most Influential People in Sports 2026.

== Personal life ==
Wu Tsai married businessman Joseph Tsai at Park Avenue Christian Church on October 4, 1996. They have three children. The Tsais announced their divorce on August 1, 2026.

Wu Tsai has a residence in La Jolla, California.
