= Alexander von Eye =

German-American psychologist (born 1949)

- Born: September 16, 1949 (age 76); Leipzig, Germany
- Education: LMU Munich; University of Trier
- Known for: Research methods in psychology
- Spouse: Donata
- Scientific career
- Fields: Psychology
- Institutions: Pennsylvania State University; Michigan State University; University of Vienna
- Thesis: Die Zirkumskriptanalyse - ein iteratives Klassifikationsverfahren (1976)

Alexander von Eye (born September 16, 1949) is a German-American psychologist and former professor of Methods in Psychology at the University of Vienna in Vienna, Austria. Before joining the University of Vienna in 2012, he taught at Michigan State University, where he served as chair of the Unit of Developmental Psychology from 2003 to 2008. Before joining Michigan State University in 1993, he served as Professor of Human Development and Psychology at Penn State University. He has developed methods for analyzing categorical and longitudinal data in psychology. He is a fellow of the American Psychological Association and the American Psychological Society. As of 2015, he lived in Montpellier, France.

== Bibliography ==
- Psychologische Prävention - Grundlagen, Programme, Methoden. (with Brandtstädter, J.) Bern: Huber, 1982. ISBN 9783456811772, OCLC 230490184
- Semantische Dimensionen. Verhaltenstheoretische Konzepte einer psychologischen Semantik.. (with Marx, W.) Göttingen: Hogrefe., 1984. ISBN 9783801702090, OCLC 310815542
- Individual development and social change: Explanatory analysis.. (with Nesselroade, J.R.) New York: Academic Press, 1985. ISBN 9781483274829, OCLC 898103183
- Introduction to Configural Frequency Analysis: The search for types and antitypes in cross-classifications. Cambridge: Cambridge University Press, 1990. ISBN 978-0521380904
- Statistical methods in longitudinal research, Vol. 1: Principles and structuring change. New York: Academic Press, 1990. ISBN 9781483297958, OCLC 898422523
- Statistical methods in longitudinal research, Vol. 2: Time series and categorical longitudinal data. New York: Academic Press, 1990. ISBN 0127249613, OCLC 874324680
- Applied computational statistics in longitudinal research. (with Rovine, M. J.) New York: Academnic Press, 1991. ISBN 0125994508, OCLC 848683767
- Prädiktionsanalyse: Vorhersagen mit kategorialen Variablen. Weinheim: Psychologie Verlagsunion, 1991. ISBN 9783621271158, OCLC 246616822
- Erziehungswissenschaftliche Statistik. Eine elementare Einführung für pädagogische Berufe.. (with Lienert, G. A.) Weinheim: Beltz, 1994. ISBN 9783407251442, OCLC 257393528
- Latent variables analysis - Applications for developmental research. (with Clogg, C.C.) Newbury Park, CA: Sage, 1994. ISBN 0803953313, OCLC 1120399879
- Analysis of categorical variables in developmental research.. San Diego, CA: Academic Press, 1996. ISBN 9780127249650, OCLC 263669959
- Regression analysis for social sciences - models and applications. (with Schuster, C.) San Diego: Academic Press, 1998. ISBN 0127249559, OCLC 39695890
- Growing up in times of social change. (with Silbereisen, R.K.) Berlin: De Gruyter, 1999. ISBN 9783110810110, OCLC 1112793589
- Statistical analysis of longitudinal categorical data - An introduction with computer illustrations. (with Niedermeier, K.E.) Mahwah, NJ: Lawrence Erlbaum, 1999. ISBN 0805831819, OCLC 41445868
- Configural Frequency Analysis - Methods, Models, and Applications. Mahwah, NJ: Lawrence Erlbaum, 2002. ISBN 1410606570, OCLC 52251060
- Pathways to positive youth development among diverse Youth. (with Lerner, R.M., Taylor, C.S.) San Francisco: Jossey-Bass, 2002. ISBN 0787963380, OCLC 66387787
- Structural equation modeling. Applications in Ecological and Evolutionary Biology. (with Pugesek, B., Tomer, A.) Cambridge, UK: Cambridge, 2003. ISBN 9780521104029, OCLC 286426598
- Analyzing rater agreement - manifest variable approaches. (with Mun, E.Y.) Mahwah, NJ: Lawrence Erlbaum, 2005. ISBN 080584967X, OCLC 54803673
- Advances in Configural Frequency Analysis. (with Mair, P., & Mun, E.-Y.) New York: Guilford Press, 2010. ISBN 9781606237199 OCLC 940683930
- Log-linear modeling - Concepts, Interpretation and Applications. (with Mun, E.-Y.) New York: Wiley, 2013. ISBN 9781118391747, OCLC 825767800
- Dependent data in social sciences research: Forms, issues, and methods of analysis. (with Stemmler, M., Wiedermann, W.) New York: Springer, 2015. ISBN 9783319205854, OCLC 1113791830
- Statistics and Causality: Methods for Applied Empirical Research. (with Wiedermann, W.) Hoboken, NJ: Wiley, 2016. ISBN 9781118947074, OCLC 1020488015
- Direction Dependence in Statistical Models: Methods of Analysis. (with Wiedermann, W., Kim, D., Sungur, E.) Hoboken, NJ: Wiley, 2020. ISBN 1119523079, OCLC 1142340179
- DieKonfigurationsfrequenzanalyse. (with Wiedermann, W.) Berlin: Springer (in preparation), 2021.
- Configural Frequency Analysis. (with Wiedermann, W.) Berlin: Springer (in preparation), 2021.
