= Manuel Arellano =

Spanish economist (born 1957)

- Born: 19 June 1957 (age 69); Elda, Alicante
- Education: London School of Economics; University of Barcelona
- Known for: Arellano–Bond estimator
- Spouse: Olympia Bover
- Scientific career
- Fields: Econometrics
- Workplaces: CEMFI
- Doctoral advisor: Denis Sargan

Manuel Arellano (born 19 June 1957) is a Spanish economist specialising in econometrics and empirical microeconomics. Together with Stephen Bond, he developed the Arellano–Bond estimator, a widely used GMM estimator for panel data. This estimator is based on the earlier article by Arellano's PhD supervisor, John Denis Sargan, and Alok Bhargava (Bhargava and Sargan, 1983). RePEc lists the paper about the Arellano-Bond estimator as the most cited article in economics.

== Biography ==
Manuel Arellano earned his undergraduate degree at Universidad de Barcelona in 1979. Later in 1982, he began graduate studies in Econometrics and Mathematical Economics at London School of Economics and completed a Ph.D. in economics in 1985.

After his graduation, he was employed as a research lecturer at University of Oxford from 1985 to 1989 and had a research fellow at Nuffield College, Oxford, from 1986 to 1989. From 1989 to 1992, he was a lecturer in economics at London School of Economics. From 1991 until now, he is a professor of Econometrics at CEMFI, Madrid.

== Publications ==
=== Books ===
- Panel Data Econometrics, Oxford University Press: Advanced Texts in Econometrics, Oxford, 2003.
- Microeconometric models and Fiscal Policy, Editor, Institute for Fiscal Studies, London, 1994.

=== Articles ===
- Some Tests of Specification for Panel Data: Monte Carlo Evidence and an Application of Employment Equations, Review of Economic Studies, Volume 58, Issue 2, pp. 277–297 (with S. Bond).
- Panel Data Models: Some Recent Developments. Included in the book: J.J. Heckman and E. Leamer (eds.): Handbook of Econometrics, Volume 5, Chapter 53, North-Holland, 2001 (with B. Honoré).
- Alvarez, Javier; Arellano, Manuel (2003). "The Time Series and Cross-Section Asymptotics of Dynamic Panel Data Estimators" (PDF). Econometrica. 71 (4): 1121–1159. doi:10.1111/1468-0262.00441. ISSN 0012-9682.
- Arellano, Manuel; Bover, Olympia (July 1995). "Another look at the instrumental variable estimation of error-components models" (PDF). Journal of Econometrics. 68 (1): 29–51. doi:10.1016/0304-4076(94)01642-d. ISSN 0304-4076.
