= Joseph Tsai =

Taiwanese businessman (born 1964)

- 蔡崇信
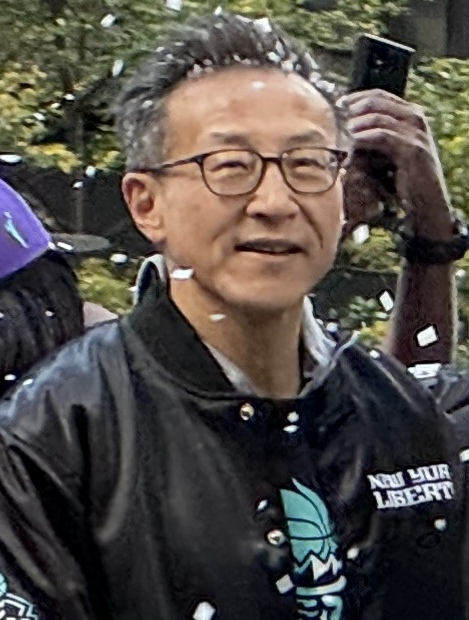
- Tsai in 2024
- Born: January 1964 (age 62); Taipei, Taiwan
- Education: Yale University (BA, JD)
- Title: Co-founder and chairman, Alibaba Group; Owner, Brooklyn Nets, New York Liberty, San Diego Seals, Las Vegas Desert Dogs, Barclays Center
- Spouse: Clara Wu Tsai (m. 1996–2026)
- Children: 3

Chinese name
- Chinese: 蔡崇信
Transcriptions
Standard Mandarin
- Hanyu Pinyin: Cài Chóngxìn
- Wade–Giles: Ts'ai^{4} Ch'ung^{2}-hsin^{4}
- IPA: [tsʰâɪ ʈʂʰʊ̌ŋɕîn]
Southern Min
- Hokkien POJ: Chhòa Chông-sìn

Joseph Chung-Hsin Tsai (Chinese: 蔡崇信; pinyin: Cài Chóngxìn; born January 19, 1964) is a Taiwanese and Canadian billionaire business executive, lawyer, and philanthropist. He is a co-founder and the chairman of the Chinese technology company Alibaba Group. Alongside his former wife Clara Wu Tsai, he owns the Brooklyn Nets of the National Basketball Association (NBA), the New York Liberty of the Women's National Basketball Association (WNBA), the San Diego Seals of the National Lacrosse League (NLL), and has interests in several other professional sports franchises.

== Early life and education ==
Tsai was born in Taipei, Taiwan, where he spent his childhood. His father, Paul C. Tsai (蔡中曾), was a prominent waishengren lawyer who was raised in Shanghai, China, and moved to Taiwan in 1948 before earning his doctorate in law from Yale Law School in 1957. After returning to Taiwan, the elder Tsai held several government positions and helped develop legislation intended to promote foreign investment and economic development. In 1965, Paul and his father, Ruchin Tsar, established Tsar & Tsai, Taiwan's first partnership law firm.

As a child, Tsai completed his early schooling in Taipei. He spent a year attending an English-language cram school in Taiwan and skipped seventh grade. In 1977, at the age of 13, he moved to the United States to attend the Lawrenceville School, a private boarding school in Lawrenceville, New Jersey. During his five years at the school, from 1977 to 1982, Tsai played on the varsity football and lacrosse teams, contributed sports writing to student publications, and performed with the school's glee club.

After graduating from Lawrenceville, Tsai attended Yale University. As an undergraduate, he joined the university's men's lacrosse team as a walk-on. He graduated from Yale College in 1986 with a Bachelor of Arts in economics and East Asian studies. He then earned his Juris Doctor (J.D.) degree from Yale Law School in 1990. As a law student, served as an editor of the Yale Law & Policy Review.

== Career ==
Tsai became a tax associate at the white-shoe law firm of Sullivan & Cromwell after graduation and was admitted as an attorney to the New York bar on 6 May 1991. After three years at the law firm, he switched to private equity and joined Rosecliff, Inc., a small management buyout firm based in New York, as vice president and general counsel. He left for Hong Kong in 1995 to join the Swedish Wallenberg family's investment conglomerate Investor AB, where he was responsible for its Asian private equity investments.

It was in this role that he first met Jack Ma in 1999 in Hangzhou after being introduced by a friend who was trying to sell his own company to Ma. Tsai was impressed with Ma's idea to create an international import and export marketplace, Ma's charismatic personality, and the enthusiasm of Ma's friends and employees. Soon after meeting Ma, Tsai quit Investor AB and joined Alibaba's founding team. He eventually held the roles of chief operating officer, chief financial officer, executive vice chairman and founding board member. Drawing from his background in corporate law and finance, Tsai led efforts to establish Alibaba's financial and legal structure. He became Alibaba's executive vice chairman in 2013 and became chairman of the company in 2023. He has become the second-largest individual shareholder of Alibaba after Ma. Tsai's net worth in 2022 was estimated to be US$8.1 billion. In 2025, he was ranked #8 on Forbes list of Hong Kong's 50 Richest, with an estimated net worth of $11.8 billion.

== Sports ownership ==
In September 2019, Tsai became the owner of the Brooklyn Nets of the NBA and chairman of Barclays Center. He initially invested in the NBA team in October 2017, purchasing a 49% stake in the Nets from Russian billionaire Mikhail Prokhorov in a deal that valued the team at $2.3 billion, with the option to buy the remaining stake of the team no later than 2021. Tsai exercised that option in August 2019, and at the same time, bought the Nets' arena from Prokhorov for nearly $1 billion in a separate deal.

Tsai's ownership in the Nets includes the Long Island Nets of the NBA G League and the Nets Gaming Crew of the NBA 2K League. In January 2019, Tsai headed a group that bought the WNBA's New York Liberty from the Madison Square Garden Company. In 2024, he sold 15% of BSE Global, the owner of the Brooklyn Nets, to Julia Koch for around $700 million. In 2025, he remained BSE chairman and Nets governor. BSE also owned operating rights to Barclays Center and the New York Liberty.

Tsai played varsity lacrosse at Yale, and is also an avid supporter of the sport of lacrosse. He is the owner of the San Diego Seals, and a co-owner of the Las Vegas Desert Dogs, both of which are professional box lacrosse teams in the National Lacrosse League (NLL). Tsai co-owns the Desert Dogs with Wayne Gretzky, Dustin Johnson, and Steve Nash.

He is also chairman of J Tsai Sports with investments in the upstart field lacrosse league, the Premier Lacrosse League and several sports media and technology companies based in North America and Asia. Tsai made his investment in the Premier Lacrosse League in February 2019, along with the Chernin Group and the Raine Group, helping fund the new lacrosse league founded by lacrosse player Paul Rabil and his brother Mike Rabil.

In March 2018, Tsai joined a Michael Rubin-led group to buy the Carolina Panthers. The bid was ultimately unsuccessful.

Tsai is also an investor in Major League Soccer franchise Los Angeles FC.

In 2022, Tsai led an investment round in Just Women's Sports, an American media company dedicated to women's sports.

In June 2024, Tsai sold a 15% minority stake in his sports holding company, BSE Global, which owns the Brooklyn Nets of the NBA, the New York Liberty of the WNBA and Barclays Center in Brooklyn, to New York billionaire Julia Koch and her children that the value assigned to the company's sports holdings was $6 billion.

In December 2024, Tsai purchased a 3% stake in the Miami Dolphins.

In May 2025, Tsai facilitated the sale of a minority stake in his WNBA team, the New York Liberty, to raise capital for a new practice facility. The transaction established a record valuation for a professional women's sports franchise at $450 million, representing a thirtyfold increase on the price Tsai paid to acquire the team in 2019.

== Personal life ==
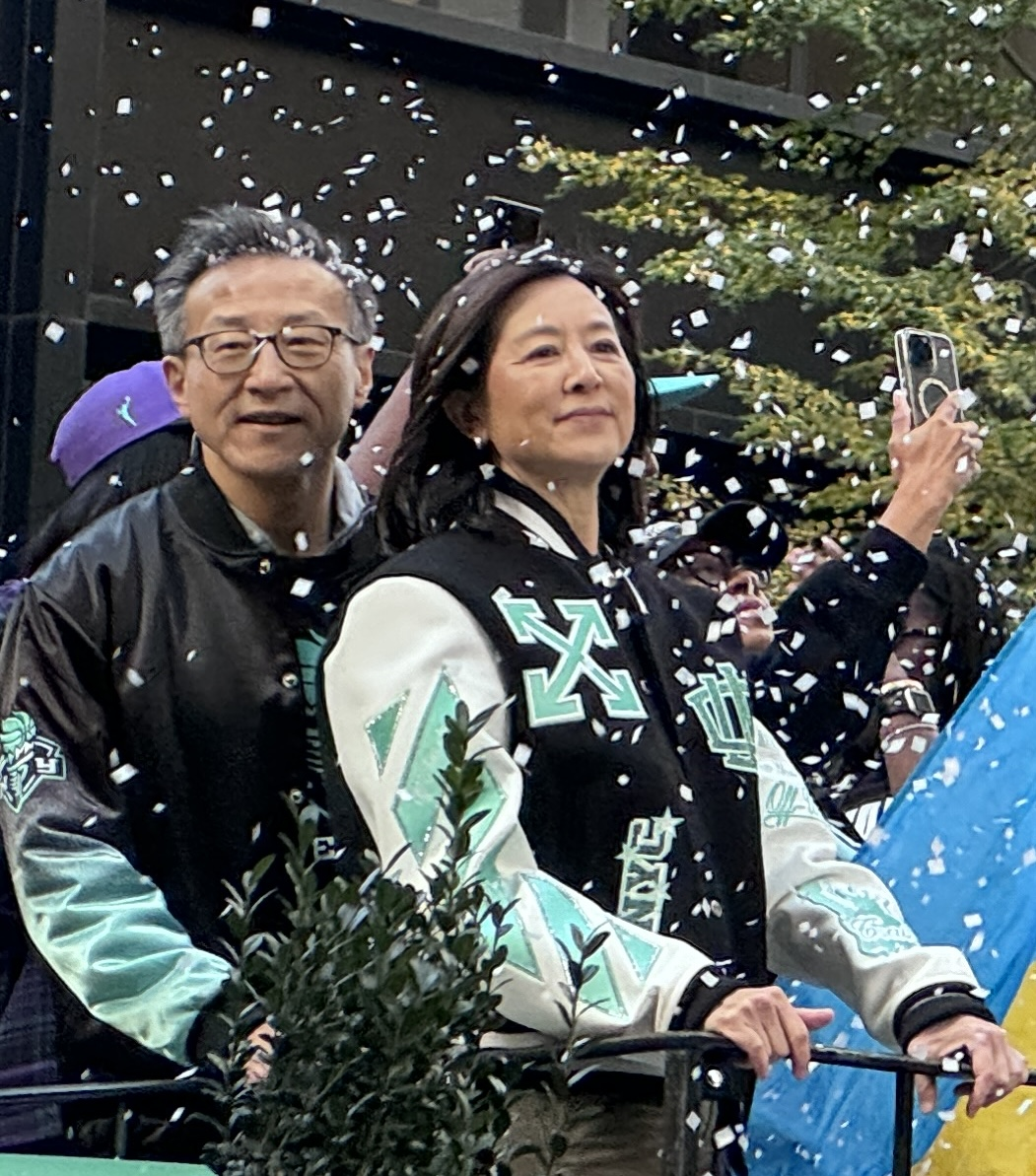
Joe Tsai and Clara Wu Tsai at the 2024 NY Liberty Ticker Tape Parade

He was married to Clara Wu Tsai, a granddaughter of Wu San-lien, the first elected mayor of Taipei City. Tsai and Wu have three children. As of 2017, Tsai's family primarily resided in the La Jolla neighborhood of San Diego, California. Tsai primarily resides in Hong Kong and spends much of his time there for business. In January 2022, Tsai paid $188 million for a penthouse at 220 Central Park South. The Tsais announced their divorce on August 1, 2026.

== Political views ==
On 7 October 2019, Tsai weighed in after Houston Rockets general manager Daryl Morey posted a tweet supporting protesters in Hong Kong. In an open letter to all NBA fans on his Facebook page, Tsai explained, with reference to historical foreign invasions of China, that Morey's tweet triggered a strong negative sentiment in China against territorial losses, especially those perceived to have been caused or escalated by foreign entities, and separatist movements.

== Philanthropy ==
In March 2016, Tsai donated $30 million to his alma mater, Yale Law School, in honor of his father to support the continuing work of the Law School's China Center and renamed it Paul Tsai China Center.

In May 2017, Tsai and his wife, through the Joe and Clara Tsai Foundation, made another donation to Yale for the construction, launch, and programs of the center and named it Tsai Center for Innovative Thinking.

In June 2017, the Tsais, again through the Joe and Clara Tsai Foundation, made a donation to his high school, the Lawrenceville School, in Mercer County, New Jersey, which was the single largest gift the school ever received. Tsai is a member of Lawrenceville's board of trustees.

In late March and early April 2020 during the COVID-19 pandemic, the Tsais donated 2.6 million masks, 170,000 goggles and 2,000 ventilators to New York. On 20 April 2020, they donated $1.6 million in medical supplies to UC San Diego to be used and shared with the region's health care systems and hospitals.

In August 2020, the Tsais donated $50 million to social justice and economic equality initiatives to support BIPOC causes.

In late 2020, the Tsais committed to contribute $50 million to Lincoln Center and the New York Philharmonic to facilitate the accelerated acoustical renovation of David Geffen Hall. On 3 August 2022, Lincoln Center and the New York Philharmonic announced the naming of the concert hall as the Wu Tsai Theater, as well as the naming of a Wu Tsai Series of concerts celebrating interdisciplinary works from diverse voices.

In February 2021, the Tsais made a donation to Yale University to establish the Wu Tsai Institute, focused on to the study of human cognition.

In July 2021, the Tsais debuted the Wu Tsai Human Performance Alliance and pledged $220 million to the foundation to fund teams of experts and academics from Stanford University, the University of Kansas, the University of Oregon, University of California, San Diego, Boston Children's Hospital and the Salk Institute for Biological Studies.

== Awards ==
In 2017, Tsai received the George H.W. Bush '48 Lifetime of Leadership Award from Yale University.

== See also ==
- List of NBA team owners
