= Olympia Bover =

Economist (Bank of Spain)

Olympia Bover is an economist who is currently director of the department of structural analysis and microeconomic studies at the Bank of Spain. She is a research fellow at the CEPR, and an International Research Associate at the Institute for Fiscal Studies in London.

She obtained her MSc and PhD from the London School of Economics and a Bachelor (Licenciada) from the University of Barcelona.

== Research ==
Her contribution to the research was to improve our understanding of Instrumental Variables approaches in economics. Her paper "Another look at the instrumental variable estimation of error-components models" (with Manuel Arellano) has been cited over 15000 times and offers better ways to use instrumental variables when dealing with panel data.

Her work has been quoted in El País, EFE and Cinco Días. Her research has been cited over 19000 times. Since 2018, she has been the Director of the Department of Structural Analysis and Macroeconomic Studies. Since 1997, she has been an International Research Fellow at the Institute for Fiscal Studies in London.

== Awards and recognition ==
She won the Kuznets Prize for the best article in the Journal of Population Economics from 2001 to 2003. She won the John W. Kendrick Prize for the best article published in the Review of Income and Wealth in 2010–2011. She was made a Fellow of the European Economic Association in 2013. She was a fellow of the IZA Institute of Labor Economics in Bonn until 2014. She is one of the 30 most cited women in economics.

== Bibliography ==
- Arellano, Manuel; Bover, Olympia (July 1995). "Another look at the instrumental variable estimation of error-components models" (PDF). Journal of Econometrics. 68 (1): 29–51. doi:10.1016/0304-4076(94)01642-D.
