= Denis Sargan =

British econometrician (1924–1996)

J. Denis Sargan
- Born: 23 August 1924; Doncaster, Yorkshire, England, United Kingdom
- Died: 13 April 1996 (aged 71); Theydon Bois, Essex, England, United Kingdom

Academic background
- Education: University of Cambridge

Academic work
- Discipline: Econometrics
- Institutions: London School of Economics
- Doctoral students: Alok Bhargava, David Forbes Hendry, Esfandiar Maasoumi, Peter C.B. Phillips, Manuel Arellano

John Denis Sargan, FBA (23 August 1924 – 13 April 1996) was a British econometrician who specialized in the analysis of economic time-series.

Sargan was born in Doncaster, Yorkshire in 1924, and was educated at Doncaster Grammar School and St John's College, Cambridge. He made many contributions, notably in instrumental variables estimation, Edgeworth expansions for the distributions of econometric estimators, identification conditions in simultaneous equations models, asymptotic tests for overidentifying restrictions in homoskedastic equations and exact tests for unit roots in autoregressive and moving average models. At the LSE, Sargan was Professor of Econometrics from 1964 to 1984. Sargan was President of the Econometric Society, a Fellow of the British Academy and an (honorary foreign) member of the American Academy of Arts and Sciences.

His influence on econometric methodology is evident in several fields including in the development of Generalized Method of Moments estimators.

== Selected publications ==
- Sargan, J. D. (1958). "The Estimation of Economic Relationships using Instrumental Variables". Econometrica. 26 (3): 393–415. doi:10.2307/1907619. JSTOR 1907619.
- Sargan, J. D. (1964). "Wages and Prices in the United Kingdom: A Study in Econometric Methodology", 16, 25–54. in Econometric Analysis for National Economic Planning, ed. by P. E. Hart, G. Mills, and J. N. Whittaker. London: Butterworths
- Sargan, J. D. (1980). "Some Tests of Dynamic Specification for a Single Equation". Econometrica. 48 (4): 879–897. doi:10.2307/1912938. JSTOR 1912938.

Published posthumously

- Sargan, J. D. (2001). "The Choice Between Sets of Regressors." Econometric Reviews 20(2).
- Sargan, J. D. (2001). "Model Building and Data Mining." Econometric Reviews 20(2): 159–170.
- Sargan, J. D. (2003). "The Development of Econometrics at LSE in the Last 30 Years." Econometric Theory 19(3): 429–438.
