= De-Min Wu =

Taiwanese econometrician (born 1933)

- 吳得民
- Born: July 6, 1933; Taipei, Taihoku Prefecture, Taiwan, Empire of Japan
- Education: National Taiwan University (BA); University of Wisconsin–Madison (PhD)
- Known for: Durbin–Wu–Hausman test
- Children: Clara Wu Tsai (daughter); Lawrence Wu (son)
- Scientific career
- Fields: Econometrics
- Workplaces: University of Kansas
- Thesis: An Empirical Analysis of Household Durable Goods Expenditure (1963)
- Doctoral advisor: Guy Orcutt

De-Min Wu (Chinese: 吳得民; pinyin: Wú Démín; born July 6, 1933) is a Taiwanese econometrician and professor emeritus of economics at the University of Kansas. He is credited with developing the Wu–Hausman test, a statistical test used to evaluate the endogeneity of variables in econometric models.

== Early life and education ==
Wu was born on July 6, 1933, in Taipei, Taihoku Prefecture. He was the second son of journalist and politician Wu San-lien and his wife, Li Ling (李菱). His mother was the eldest daughter of Li Zhao-wei (李兆偉), whose family operated a trading business in Tainan dealing in rice and other grains. Wu was one of seven children in the family, which included five sons and two daughters.

In November 1933, several months after Wu's birth, his father was appointed head of the Tokyo bureau of the Taiwanese newspaper Taiwan Shinminpo, prompting the family to relocate to Japan. In December 1944, toward the end of World War II, his father brought the family from Tokyo to Tianjin, China. The family returned to Taiwan at the end of 1946 and settled in Taipei. In January 1951, his father was elected the first popularly-elected Mayor of Taipei.

After graduating from Taipei Municipal Chien Kuo High School, Wu enrolled at National Taiwan University. He graduated with a Bachelor of Arts degree in economics in 1956. He then earned his Ph.D. in economics from the University of Wisconsin–Madison in 1963. His doctoral dissertation was titled, An Empirical Analysis of Household Durable Goods Expenditure.

== Academic career ==
Wu joined the Department of Economics at the University of Kansas in 1964 and remained on its faculty until 1999. During his tenure, he held appointments as assistant professor, associate professor, and full professor of economics. He served for seven years as director of graduate studies and deputy chair of the economics department. He was a Fulbright Scholar in Japan during the 1986–1987 academic year. From 1990 to 1993, he was chair of the Department of Economics at the University of Kansas. He became professor emeritus upon his retirement in 1999.

== Personal life ==
Wu is married to Chin-Sha Wu, with whom he has two children: Lawrence Wu and Clara Wu Tsai. Both children grew up in Lawrence, Kansas, during their father's tenure at the University of Kansas.

== Selected publications ==
- Wu, De-Min (1965). "An Empirical Analysis of Household Durable Goods Expenditure". Econometrica. 33 (4): 761–780. doi:10.2307/1910354.
- Richardson, David H.; Wu, De-Min (1970). "Least Squares and Grouping Method Estimators in the Errors in Variables Model". Journal of the American Statistical Association. 65 (330): 724–748. doi:10.2307/2284583.
- Richardson, David H.; Wu, De-Min (1971). "A Note on the Comparison of Ordinary and Two-Stage Least Squares Estimators". Econometrica. 39 (6): 973–981. doi:10.2307/1909670.
- Wu, De-Min (1973). "Alternative Tests of Independence between Stochastic Regressors and Disturbances". Econometrica. 41 (4): 733–750. doi:10.2307/1914093.
- Wu, De-Min (1974). "Alternative Tests of Independence between Stochastic Regressors and Disturbances: Finite Sample Results". Econometrica. 42 (3): 529–546. doi:10.2307/1911789.
- Wu, De-Min (1975). "Estimation of the Cobb-Douglas Production Function". Econometrica. 43 (4): 739–744. doi:10.2307/1913082.
- Wu, Lawrence; Wu, De-Min (1997). "Measuring the Degree of Interindustry Competition in U.S. v. Continental Can". The Antitrust Bulletin. 42 (1): 51–84. doi:10.1177/0003603X9704200106.

== See also ==
- Durbin–Wu–Hausman test
