= Alok Bhargava =

Indian econometrician (born 1954)

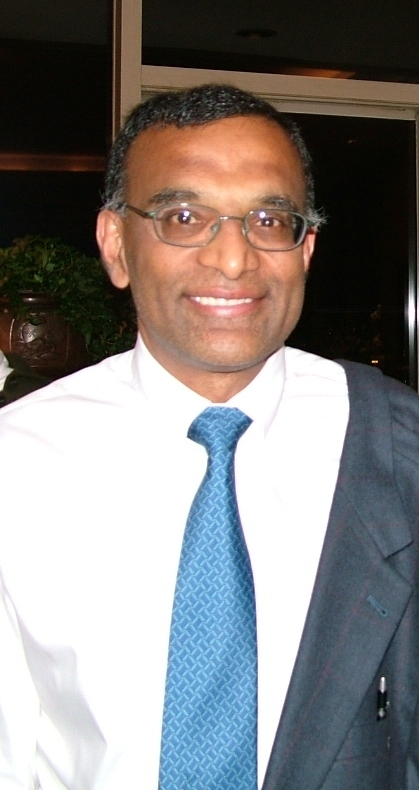
- Alok Bhargava
- Born: 13 July 1954 (age 72); Alwar, Rajasthan, India
- Education: Delhi University; London School of Economics
- Occupation: Professor at the University of Maryland School of Public Policy

Alok Bhargava (born 13 July 1954) is an Indian econometrician. He studied mathematics at Delhi University and economics and econometrics at the London School of Economics. He is currently a full professor at the University of Maryland School of Public Policy.

== Education ==
In 1974 he received his BA with honors in mathematics at Delhi University. In 1977 he got his BSc in economics at London School of Economics. In 1978 he received his MSc in economometrics at London School of Economics. Bhargava received his PhD in econometrics from the London School of Economics under the supervision of John Denis Sargan in 1982. His thesis (The Theory of the Durbin–Watson Statistic with special reference to the Specification of Models in Levels as against in Differences) led to many tests for unit roots that were used in co-integration analyses. Bhargava was also one of the pioneers in econometric methods for longitudinal ("panel") data.

== Career ==
From 1983 till 1989 he served as an assistant professor of economics at University of Pennsylvania. From 1989 till 1993 he was an associate professor of economics at University of Houston and was a full professor from 1994 to around 2012. During the autumn of 1995 he was invited to teach at Harvard University as a visiting professor. In 1999 he was a Senior Global Health Leadership Fellow at World Health Organization. In 2005 he served as a visiting professor at University of Paris.

Since 1991, Bhargava has been publishing on important aspects of nutrition, food policy, population health, child development, demography, epidemiology, AIDS, and finance in developing and developed countries. His academic publications demonstrate the usefulness of rigorous econometric and statistical methods in addressing issues of under-nutrition and poor child health in developing countries, as well as obesity in developed countries.

Bhargava was an editor of the Journal of Econometrics (1997 and 2014) and is an associate editor of the multi-disciplinary journal Economics and Human Biology. He has held teaching positions at the University of Pennsylvania, Harvard University and University of Houston, and has published over 70 articles in academic journals.

== Books and reviews ==
A collection of his works has been reprinted in a separate volume in 2006 entitled "Econometrics, statistics and computational approaches in food and health sciences". A monograph entitled "Food, economics, and health" was published in 2008 [4] and was reviewed in the Journal of the American Medical Association with the commendation that "Alok Bhargava is a pioneer in efforts to break down the existing firewalls between the biomedical and social sciences and between the health profession and the food systems (https://jamanetwork.com/journals/jama/article-abstract/186008).

== Selected publications ==
- Bhargava, A.; Franzini, L.; Narendranathan, W. (October 1982). "Serial Correlation and the Fixed Effects Model". The Review of Economic Studies. 49 (4): 533. doi:10.2307/2297285. JSTOR 2297285.
- Sargan, J. D.; Bhargava, Alok (January 1983). "Testing Residuals from Least Squares Regression for Being Generated by the Gaussian Random Walk". Econometrica. 51 (1): 153. doi:10.2307/1912252. JSTOR 1912252.
- Bhargava, Alok (July 1986). "On the Theory of Testing for Unit Roots in Observed Time Series". The Review of Economic Studies. 53 (3): 369–384. doi:10.2307/2297634. JSTOR 2297634.
- Bhargava, Alok (1991). "Estimating Short and Long Run Income Elasticities of Foods and Nutrients for Rural South India". Journal of the Royal Statistical Society. Series A (Statistics in Society). 154 (1): 157–174. doi:10.2307/2982709. JSTOR 2982709.
- Bhargava, Alok; Jamison, Dean T; Lau, Lawrence J; Murray, Christopher JL (May 2001). "Modeling the effects of health on economic growth". Journal of Health Economics. 20 (3): 423–440. doi:10.1016/S0167-6296(01)00073-X. PMID 11373839.
- Bhargava, Alok (August 2005). "AIDS epidemic and the psychological well-being and school participation of Ethiopian orphans". Psychology, Health & Medicine. 10 (3): 263–275. doi:10.1080/13548500412331334181. S2CID 143754659.
- Bhargava, Alok; Docquier, Frédéric; Moullan, Yasser (2011). "Modeling the effects of physician emigration on human development". Economics & Human Biology. 9 (2): 172–183. doi:10.1016/j.ehb.2010.12.004. PMID 21288783.
- Bhargava, Alok (April 2013). "Executive compensation, share repurchases and investment expenditures: econometric evidence from US firms". Review of Quantitative Finance and Accounting. 40 (3): 403–422. doi:10.1007/s11156-011-0260-1. S2CID 154714709.
