= Opinion polling for the 2013 German federal election =

This is a list of opinion polling results for the 2013 German federal election, held on 22 September 2013.

Final results of the election had the CDU/CSU score 41.5% of the vote, their best result since tallying 47% in the 1990 election, but nonetheless five seats short of an absolute majority. The CDU/CSU's junior partner in the outgoing coalition, the FDP, failed to pass the 5% threshold and will therefore go without representation for the first time in the party's history. The SPD and Greens (red-green coalition), partners in the 1998–2005 Schröder governments, also fell short of the number of votes to get a majority. With neither coalition obtaining a majority on its own a grand coalition was formed by the CDU/CSU with the SPD due to the FDP's failure to obtain the minimum of 5% of votes required to enter parliament. This coalition was similar to the 2005–2009 Merkel government.

== Graphical summary ==
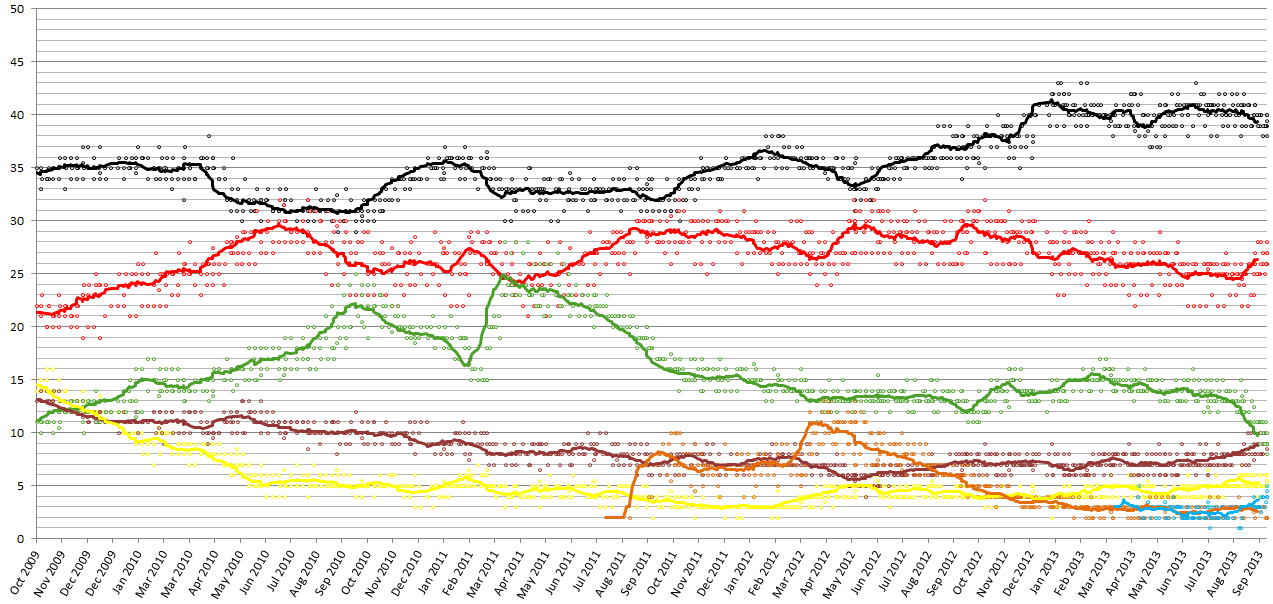
15-point average trend line of poll results from 2 October 2009 to 22 September 2013, with each line corresponding to a political party. CDU/CSU SPD FDP LINKE GRÜNE PIRATEN AfD

The chart shows the relative state of the parties from October 2009 to the September 2013 election.

== Party polling ==
=== 2013 ===
Date	Polling Firm	Union	SPD	FDP	Linke	Grüne	Piraten	AfD	Others	Lead
22 Sep 2013	Election Results	41.5	25.7	4.8	8.6	8.4	2.2	4.7	4.1	15.8
20 Sep 2013	Allensbach	39.5	27.0	5.5	9.0	9.0	2.0	4.5	3.5	12.5
20 Sep 2013	Forsa	40	26	5	9	10	2	4	4	14
20 Sep 2013	Emnid	39	26	5	9	9	-	4	7	13
19 Sep 2013	INSA	38	28	6	9	8	2	5	4	10
19 Sep 2013	FGW	40.0	27.0	5.5	8.5	9.0	-	4.0	6.0	13.0
18 Sep 2013	Allensbach	39.0	26.0	6.0	9.0	11.0	2.0	3.5	3.5	13.0
17 Sep 2013	Forsa	39	25	5	10	9	3	3	6	14
15 Sep 2013	INSA	38	27	4	8	11	3	4	5	11
15 Sep 2013	Emnid	39	26	5	9	10	3	4	4	13
13 Sep 2013	FGW	40	26	6	8	11	-	4	5	14
12 Sep 2013	Infratest	40.0	28.0	5.0	8.0	10.0	2.5	2.5	40	12.0
11 Sep 2013	Forsa	39	25	6	10	9	3	3	5	14
10 Sep 2013	GMS	40	25	5	9	11	3	3	4	15
9 Sep 2013	INSA	39	28	4	8	11	3	3	4	11
8 Sep 2013	Emnid	40	25	5	9	11	3	3	4	15
5 Sep 2013	FGW	41	26	6	8	10	-	3	6	15
5 Sep 2013	Infratest	41	27	5	8	10	2	3	4	14
4 Sep 2013	Forsa	40	23	5	9	11	3	4	5	17
4 Sep 2013	Allensbach	40.0	25.0	6.0	7.5	12.5	2.5	3.0	3.5	15.0
2 Sep 2013	INSA	39	26	5	8	13	3	3	3	13
1 Sep 2013	Emnid	39	23	6	10	11	3	3	5	16
29 Aug 2013	FGW	41	26	6	7	12	-	3	5	15
29 Aug 2013	Infratest	41	26	5	8	11	-	3	6	15
28 Aug 2013	Forsa	41	22	5	10	11	3	3	5	19
26 Aug 2013	INSA	39	25	6	7	14	3	3	3	14
25 Aug 2013	Emnid	40	25	5	8	12	3	3	4	15
23 Aug 2013	FGW	41	25	6	8	13	-	-	7	16
23 Aug 2013	Infratest	42	24	5	9	12	2	3	3	18
21 Aug 2013	Forsa	41	22	6	8	13	3	2	5	19
21 Aug 2013	Allensbach	39.0	24.5	7.0	7.0	13.5	2.0	3.0	4.0	14.5
20 Aug 2013	INSA	38	26	5	8	15	3	3	2	12
20 Aug 2013	GMS	41	25	6	8	12	3	1	4	16
18 Aug 2013	Emnid	40	24	6	8	12	4	1	5	16
16 Aug 2013	FGW	41	25	5	8	13	3	-	5	16
15 Aug 2013	Infratest	42	25	5	8	12	3	-	5	17
14 Aug 2013	Forsa	40	23	5	8	13	3	3	5	17
13 Aug 2013	INSA	39	26	5	8	14	2	3	3	13
11 Aug 2013	Emnid	41	25	5	8	13	3	2	3	16
9 Aug 2013	Infratest	42	25	5	7	13	3	-	5	17
7 Aug 2013	Forsa	40	23	5	7	14	3	3	5	17
5 Aug 2013	INSA	39	26	5	8	14	2	2	4	13
4 Aug 2013	Emnid	40	25	5	8	13	3	2	4	15
2 Aug 2013	FGW	40	27	5	7	14	-	-	7	13
1 Aug 2013	Infratest	42	26	5	7	13	-	-	7	16
31 Jul 2013	Forsa	41	22	5	8	13	3	2	6	19
30 Jul 2013	INSA	39	26	4	7	15	2	3	4	13
28 Jul 2013	Emnid	40	25	5	8	13	3	3	3	15
25 Jul 2013	Infratest	42	25	4	7	14	2	2	4	17
24 Jul 2013	Forsa	41	22	5	9	12	4	2	5	19
23 Jul 2013	INSA	38	26	5	7	15	2	3	4	12
21 Jul 2013	Emnid	40	25	6	8	13	3	2	3	15
19 Jul 2013	Infratest	41	26	4	7	13	2	3	4	15
17 Jul 2013	Forsa	41	23	5	8	14	2	2	5	18
16 Jul 2013	INSA	38	26	5	8	15	2	3	3	12
16 Jul 2013	GMS	41	25	5	7	13	2	2	5	16
14 Jul 2013	Emnid	41	26	5	7	12	4	1	4	15
12 Jul 2013	Infratest	41	26	4	6	14	-	3	6	15
12 Jul 2013	FGW	41	26	5	7	13	-	3	5	15
12 Jul 2013	Allensbach	40.0	25.5	6.5	6.0	12.5	2.0	3.5	4.0	14.5
10 Jul 2013	Forsa	41	22	5	9	15	2	2	4	19
9 Jul 2013	INSA	39	26	5	7	14	2	3	4	13
7 Jul 2013	Emnid	42	26	4	8	12	3	2	3	16
4 Jul 2013	Infratest	42	25	4	7	14	3	-	5	17
3 Jul 2013	Forsa	41	22	5	9	14	2	2	5	19
1 Jul 2013	INSA	40	25	4	7	15	2	3	4	15
30 Jun 2013	Emnid	41	25	5	7	13	3	2	4	16
28 Jun 2013	Infratest	41	26	4	7	13	3	-	6	15
28 Jun 2013	FGW	43	26	4	6	13	-	3	5	17
26 Jun 2013	Forsa	41	22	5	8	15	2	2	5	19
24 Jun 2013	INSA	39	26	4	7	16	2	2	4	13
23 Jun 2013	Emnid	41	25	4	8	14	3	2	3	16
21 Jun 2013	Infratest	41	25	5	7	14	-	-	8	16
19 Jun 2013	Forsa	40	22	6	8	15	2	2	5	18
19 Jun 2013	INSA	40	25	4	7	15	3	3	3	15
19 Jun 2013	Allensbach	38.0	26.0	6.0	7.0	14.0	2.0	3.0	4.0	12.0
18 Jun 2013	GMS	41	25	5	8	14	2	2	3	16
16 Jun 2013	Emnid	41	25	5	8	13	3	2	3	16
14 Jun 2013	Infratest	41	26	4	7	15	-	2	5	15
12 Jun 2013	Forsa	40	24	5	9	13	2	2	5	16
11 Jun 2013	INSA	39	26	5	7	14	2	3	4	13
9 Jun 2013	Emnid	41	26	4	7	13	3	3	3	15
7 Jun 2013	FGW	42	28	4	6	13	-	3	4	14
6 Jun 2013	Infratest	41	27	4	6	14	-	3	5	14
5 Jun 2013	Forsa	41	24	4	8	13	3	3	4	17
4 Jun 2013	INSA	39	27	4	6	15	3	3	3	12
2 Jun 2013	Emnid	40	26	5	7	14	4	2	2	14
1 Jun 2013	INSA	39	26	4	7	14	3	4	3	13
31 May 2013	Infratest	42	26	4	6	14	-	3	5	16
28 May 2013	Forsa	40	24	4	8	14	3	3	4	16
27 May 2013	INSA	39	25	4	7	14	2	3	6	14
26 May 2013	Emnid	40	27	4	7	13	4	2	3	13
24 May 2013	Infratest	41	27	4	6	14	2	2	4	14
22 May 2013	INSA	38	26	5	8	13	2	3	5	12
22 May 2013	Forsa	41	24	4	8	13	3	3	4	17
22 May 2013	Allensbach	39.0	27.0	6.0	6.0	13.0	2.5	3.5	3.0	12.0
19 May 2013	Emnid	39	26	4	7	15	4	3	2	13
17 May 2013	INSA	37	27	4	8	14	3	3	4	10
17 May 2013	Infratest	41	26	4	6	14	3	3	3	15
17 May 2013	FGW	41	29	4	6	13	-	3	4	12
16 May 2013	GMS	40	25	4	7	14	3	3	4	15
15 May 2013	Forsa	40	23	4	9	14	3	2	5	17
13 May 2013	INSA	37	27	4	7	15	3	3	4	10
12 May 2013	Emnid	38	26	4	8	15	4	2	3	12
10 May 2013	Infratest	40	27	5	6	14	-	3	5	13
7 May 2013	Forsa	39	24	4	8	15	2	3	5	15
7 May 2013	INSA	37	26	5	7	15	3	3	4	11
5 May 2013	Emnid	37	27	5	7	15	4	2	3	10
3 May 2013	Allensbach	38.5	26.0	5.5	6.0	15.0	3.0	3.5	2.5	12.5
2 May 2013	Infratest	40	26	4	7	15	-	3	5	14
1 May 2013	Forsa	39	23	5	8	14	3	3	5	16
29 Apr 2013	INSA	38	26	5	7	16	2	3	3	12
28 Apr 2013	Emnid	40	27	4	7	14	3	2	3	13
26 Apr 2013	FGW	40	28	4	6	14	-	3	5	12
26 Apr 2013	Infratest	40	27	4	7	14	2	3	3	13
24 Apr 2013	Forsa	42	23	5	7	14	3	2	4	19
22 Apr 2013	INSA	38	26	5	6	15	2	5	3	12
21 Apr 2013	INSA	39	26	5	6	14	2	4	4	13
21 Apr 2013	Emnid	39	26	5	8	14	4	-	4	13
21 Apr 2013	Infratest	41	27	4	7	14	-	3	4	14
17 Apr 2013	Forsa	42	22	5	8	15	3	-	5	20
17 Apr 2013	Allensbach	38.5	28.0	5.0	7.0	15.0	3.0	-	3.5	10.5
16 Apr 2013	INSA	39	26	5	6	15	3	3	3	13
16 Apr 2013	GMS	42	24	6	8	13	2	-	5	18
14 Apr 2013	Emnid	41	26	5	8	14	3	-	3	15
12 Apr 2013	Infratest	42	27	4	7	15	2	-	3	15
12 Apr 2013	FGW	42	27	4	6	14	-	-	7	15
10 Apr 2013	Forsa	41	23	6	9	14	3	-	4	18
9 Apr 2013	INSA	39	26	5	7	16	2	-	5	13
7 Apr 2013	Emnid	39	26	5	8	15	3	-	4	13
4 Apr 2013	Infratest	41	27	4	8	14	3	-	3	14
3 Apr 2013	Forsa	40	24	5	8	15	3	-	5	16
31 Mar 2013	Emnid	39	26	5	7	15	3	-	5	13
28 Mar 2013	Infratest	39	28	4	8	15	3	-	3	11
26 Mar 2013	Forsa	41	24	5	8	14	3	-	5	17
25 Mar 2013	INSA	39	27	5	8	14	3	-	4	12
24 Mar 2013	Emnid	40	27	5	7	15	3	-	3	13
22 Mar 2013	Infratest	38	27	5	8	16	2	-	4	11
22 Mar 2013	INSA	40	27	5	7	15	2	-	4	13
22 Mar 2013	FGW	40	29	4	7	14	3	-	3	11
20 Mar 2013	Forsa	40	24	6	7	15	3	-	5	16
20 Mar 2013	Allensbach	39.5	26.5	6.0	6.0	15.5	2.5	-	4.0	13.0
19 Mar 2013	GMS	40	26	5	7	16	3	-	3	14
17 Mar 2013	Emnid	39	28	4	8	16	3	-	2	11
14 Mar 2013	Infratest	40	25	5	7	17	3	-	3	15
13 Mar 2013	Forsa	40	24	4	8	16	3	-	5	16
12 Mar 2013	INSA	40	27	5	6	16	2	-	4	13
10 Mar 2013	Emnid	40	27	4	8	15	3	-	3	13
8 Mar 2013	FGW	41	28	4	7	14	-	-	6	13
7 Mar 2013	Infratest	40	26	4	7	17	2	-	4	14
6 Mar 2013	Forsa	40	25	4	8	15	3	-	5	15
4 Mar 2013	INSA	41	26	5	7	15	3	-	3	15
3 Mar 2013	Emnid	40	27	5	7	15	3	-	3	13
28 Feb 2013	Infratest	41	27	4	6	15	3	-	4	14
27 Feb 2013	Forsa	40	25	4	8	16	2	-	5	15
26 Feb 2013	INSA	40	28	5	7	15	2	-	3	12
24 Feb 2013	Emnid	41	27	4	7	14	4	-	3	14
22 Feb 2013	FGW	40	30	4	6	14	2	-	4	10
21 Feb 2013	Infratest	40	28	5	6	15	3	-	3	12
20 Feb 2013	Forsa	43	24	3	7	15	3	-	5	19
20 Feb 2013	Allensbach	39.0	27.0	6.0	6.5	15.0	3.0	-	3.5	12.0
19 Feb 2013	INSA	40	29	5	6	15	2	-	3	11
19 Feb 2013	GMS	40	27	5	6	15	3	-	4	13
17 Feb 2013	Emnid	41	27	4	6	15	3	-	4	14
15 Feb 2013	Infratest	40	27	4	7	16	3	-	3	13
13 Feb 2013	Forsa	43	25	3	7	14	3	-	5	18
12 Feb 2013	INSA	39	29	4	6	15	3	-	4	10
10 Feb 2013	Emnid	40	27	4	7	15	4	-	3	13
7 Feb 2013	Infratest	39	29	4	6	15	3	-	4	10
6 Feb 2013	Forsa	41	25	4	7	15	3	-	5	16
4 Feb 2013	INSA	40	29	4	6	15	2	-	4	11
3 Feb 2013	Emnid	41	27	4	7	14	4	-	3	14
31 Jan 2013	Infratest	40	27	4	6	15	4	-	4	13
30 Jan 2013	Forsa	40	25	4	8	15	3	-	5	15
29 Jan 2013	INSA	40	28	5	6	15	3	-	3	12
29 Jan 2013	GMS	42	26	5	6	15	3	-	3	16
27 Jan 2013	Emnid	41	27	4	7	13	4	-	4	14
25 Jan 2013	FGW	41	29	4	6	13	3	-	4	12
24 Jan 2013	Infratest	42	27	4	6	14	3	-	4	15
23 Jan 2013	Forsa	42	23	4	8	14	4	-	5	19
23 Jan 2013	Allensbach	39.0	28.0	5.0	7.0	14.0	3.0	-	4.0	11.0
22 Jan 2013	INSA	41	27	4	7	14	3	-	4	14
20 Jan 2013	Emnid	43	25	4	7	13	4	-	4	18
18 Jan 2013	Infratest	42	26	4	7	13	4	-	4	16
16 Jan 2013	Forsa	43	23	3	8	14	4	-	5	20
15 Jan 2013	INSA	39	28	4	7	15	3	-	4	11
13 Jan 2013	Emnid	41	26	3	8	14	4	-	4	13
11 Jan 2013	FGW	42	28	4	6	13	3	-	4	14
10 Jan 2013	Infratest	41	28	4	6	14	3	-	4	13
9 Jan 2013	Forsa	42	25	2	9	15	3	-	4	17
7 Jan 2013	INSA	39	28	4	7	14	3	-	5	11
6 Jan 2013	Emnid	40	27	4	8	14	4	-	3	13
4 Jan 2013	Infratest	41	29	4	6	12	4	-	4	12

=== 2012 ===
Date	Polling Firm	Union	SPD	FDP	Linke	Grüne	Piraten	Others	Lead
26 Dec 2012	Forsa	41	27	4	8	13	3	4	14
23 Dec 2012	Emnid	40	28	4	8	13	4	3	12
21 Dec 2012	Infratest	40	30	4	7	13	3	3	10
19 Dec 2012	Forsa	38	27	5	8	14	3	5	11
19 Dec 2012	Allensbach	37.5	30.0	4.5	6.5	14.0	3.5	4.0	7.5
18 Dec 2012	INSA	36	29	5	7	13	4	6	7
17 Dec 2012	GMS	40	29	4	7	14	3	3	11
16 Dec 2012	Emnid	40	28	4	7	14	4	3	12
14 Dec 2012	FGW	40	30	4	7	13	3	3	10
12 Dec 2012	Forsa	38	27	4	8	14	4	5	11
11 Dec 2012	INSA	37	29	4	7	14	3	6	8
9 Dec 2012	Emnid	40	28	4	7	14	3	4	12
6 Dec 2012	Infratest	39	30	4	7	14	3	3	9
5 Dec 2012	Forsa	37	26	4	7	16	4	6	11
4 Dec 2012	INSA	35	29	5	7	15	4	5	6
2 Dec 2012	Emnid	38	28	4	8	14	4	4	10
30 Nov 2012	FGW	38	29	4	7	14	4	4	9
28 Nov 2012	Forsa	37	26	4	8	16	4	5	11
27 Nov 2012	INSA	36	29	4	7	15	4	5	7
25 Nov 2012	Emnid	38	29	4	7	15	4	3	9
23 Nov 2012	Infratest	39	29	4	6	15	4	3	10
22 Nov 2012	GMS	37	26	4	8	16	4	5	11
21 Nov 2012	Forsa	36	26	4	8	16	5	5	10
21 Nov 2012	Allensbach	37.5	31.0	4.0	6.5	12.5	4.0	4.5	6.5
19 Nov 2012	INSA	38	29	4	7	14	4	4	9
18 Nov 2012	Emnid	39	28	4	7	13	5	4	11
16 Nov 2012	FGW	39	30	4	6	13	4	4	9
14 Nov 2012	Forsa	39	26	4	8	14	4	5	13
13 Nov 2012	INSA	38	30	5	6	14	4	3	8
11 Nov 2012	Emnid	38	30	4	7	12	5	4	8
8 Nov 2012	Infratest	40	30	4	6	14	4	2	10
7 Nov 2012	Forsa	37	26	3	8	15	5	6	11
6 Nov 2012	INSA	38	30	4	6	14	3	5	8
4 Nov 2012	Emnid	38	29	4	8	13	4	4	9
30 Oct 2012	Forsa	38	26	3	8	15	5	5	12
30 Oct 2012	INSA	37	30	4	7	13	4	5	7
28 Oct 2012	Emnid	38	29	4	8	12	5	4	9
26 Oct 2012	FGW	39	29	4	6	13	4	5	10
26 Oct 2012	Infratest	38	30	4	7	13	5	3	8
25 Oct 2012	GMS	38	27	4	8	12	5	6	11
24 Oct 2012	Forsa	38	27	3	9	12	5	6	11
23 Oct 2012	INSA	35	32	4	7	13	4	5	3
21 Oct 2012	Emnid	38	29	4	7	12	6	4	9
17 Oct 2012	Forsa	37	29	4	8	11	5	6	8
17 Oct 2012	Allensbach	35.5	31.0	4.5	6.0	14.0	5.0	4.0	4.5
15 Oct 2012	INSA	36	31	4	7	12	4	6	5
14 Oct 2012	Emnid	38	30	4	8	11	5	4	8
11 Oct 2012	FGW	38	31	4	6	12	5	4	7
10 Oct 2012	Forsa	36	30	4	7	12	6	5	6
9 Oct 2012	INSA	36	30	5	7	11	5	6	6
7 Oct 2012	Emnid	37	28	5	8	12	6	4	9
4 Oct 2012	Infratest	39	31	4	7	11	4	4	8
2 Oct 2012	Forsa	35	29	4	8	12	7	5	6
2 Oct 2012	Forsa	37	27	4	8	12	7	5	10
2 Oct 2012	INSA	36	29	4	7	13	5	6	7
30 Sep 2012	Emnid	37	27	5	8	13	6	4	10
28 Sep 2012	FGW	38	29	4	6	13	6	4	9
28 Sep 2012	Infratest	37	30	4	7	12	6	4	7
26 Sep 2012	Forsa	38	26	4	8	12	7	5	12
26 Sep 2012	Allensbach	34.0	30.0	5.5	6.5	14.0	5.5	4.5	4.0
25 Sep 2012	INSA	36	30	5	6	14	5	4	6
23 Sep 2012	Emnid	37	27	5	8	13	6	4	10
21 Sep 2012	GMS	38	26	5	6	13	6	6	12
20 Sep 2012	INSA	36	29	4	7	13	6	5	7
19 Sep 2012	Forsa	38	26	5	8	12	6	5	12
16 Sep 2012	Emnid	38	26	4	7	14	7	4	12
14 Sep 2012	FGW	36	30	4	6	13	6	5	6
12 Sep 2012	Forsa	39	26	4	8	13	6	4	13
11 Sep 2012	INSA	37	28	4	6	14	6	5	9
9 Sep 2012	Emnid	36	28	4	7	14	7	4	8
6 Sep 2012	Infratest	37	30	4	6	13	6	4	7
5 Sep 2012	Forsa	39	26	4	7	13	7	4	13
4 Sep 2012	INSA	36	29	4	6	14	6	5	7
2 Sep 2012	Emnid	36	28	5	7	13	7	4	8
29 Aug 2012	Forsa	39	26	5	7	12	7	4	13
28 Aug 2012	INSA	35	29	4	6	15	6	5	6
26 Aug 2012	Emnid	36	28	4	7	14	7	4	8
24 Aug 2012	FGW	37	29	5	6	12	6	5	8
23 Aug 2012	GMS	36	28	5	6	13	7	5	8
22 Aug 2012	Forsa	36	27	5	8	13	7	4	9
22 Aug 2012	Allensbach	35.0	28.0	5.5	6.0	15.0	6.5	4.0	7.0
21 Aug 2012	INSA	36	28	4	6	15	7	4	8
19 Aug 2012	Emnid	35	29	5	7	13	8	3	6
17 Aug 2012	Infratest	36	29	5	6	13	7	4	7
15 Aug 2012	Forsa	36	26	4	7	13	9	5	10
14 Aug 2012	INSA	35	30	4	6	14	6	5	5
12 Aug 2012	Emnid	36	28	4	7	14	8	3	8
8 Aug 2012	Forsa	36	26	5	6	13	9	5	10
7 Aug 2012	INSA	36	30	5	6	13	6	4	6
5 Aug 2012	Emnid	36	29	5	7	13	7	3	7
2 Aug 2012	INSA	35	31	4	6	15	6	3	4
1 Aug 2012	Forsa	36	27	5	6	12	9	5	9
1 Aug 2012	Infratest	36	28	5	6	13	8	4	8
29 Jul 2012	Emnid	36	29	4	7	12	8	4	7
25 Jul 2012	Forsa	36	27	4	7	12	9	5	9
24 Jul 2012	INSA	35	30	5	6	15	6	3	5
24 Jul 2012	GMS	35	29	4	6	13	8	5	6
22 Jul 2012	Emnid	35	29	5	6	13	8	4	6
20 Jul 2012	Infratest	35	30	4	6	14	8	3	5
18 Jul 2012	Forsa	36	26	4	6	13	10	5	10
18 Jul 2012	Allensbach	36.0	27.0	6.0	6.0	14.0	6.5	4.5	9.0
17 Jul 2012	INSA	36	29	4	6	14	7	4	7
15 Jul 2012	Emnid	34	29	5	7	13	9	3	5
13 Jul 2012	FGW	36	30	4	6	13	7	4	6
11 Jul 2012	Forsa	36	26	4	7	13	9	5	10
10 Jul 2012	INSA	35	28	4	6	14	8	5	7
8 Jul 2012	Emnid	34	29	5	6	14	9	3	5
5 Jul 2012	Infratest	35	30	4	7	14	7	3	5
4 Jul 2012	Forsa	36	27	3	7	12	9	6	9
3 Jul 2012	INSA	35	29	4	5	14	8	5	6
1 Jul 2012	Emnid	34	31	5	6	13	8	3	3
27 Jun 2012	Forsa	34	27	4	7	13	10	5	7
25 Jun 2012	INSA	34	31	5	6	14	7	4	3
24 Jun 2012	Emnid	34	30	5	6	13	9	3	4
22 Jun 2012	Infratest	34	31	4	6	14	8	3	3
22 Jun 2012	GMS	34	28	6	5	13	10	4	6
20 Jun 2012	Forsa	33	27	5	7	13	10	5	6
20 Jun 2012	Allensbach	34.0	28.0	5.5	5.0	15.5	7.5	4.5	6.0
19 Jun 2012	INSA	35	31	5	5	14	7	3	4
17 Jun 2012	Emnid	33	29	6	7	12	9	4	4
15 Jun 2012	FGW	34	32	5	5	13	7	4	2
13 Jun 2012	Forsa	32	27	5	7	14	10	5	5
12 Jun 2012	INSA	35	31	5	5	13	7	4	4
10 Jun 2012	Emnid	32	30	5	6	13	10	4	2
6 Jun 2012	Infratest	34	30	5	5	13	9	4	4
5 Jun 2012	Forsa	33	27	4	6	14	11	5	6
5 Jun 2012	INSA	34	32	5	4	14	7	4	2
3 Jun 2012	Emnid	33	29	5	6	12	11	4	4
30 May 2012	Forsa	32	27	5	6	13	12	5	5
29 May 2012	INSA	33	31	5	5	14	8	4	2
25 May 2012	Infratest	33	29	5	6	13	11	3	4
25 May 2012	FGW	36	31	4	5	14	7	3	5
24 May 2012	Emnid	32	30	6	6	12	11	3	2
23 May 2012	Forsa	31	27	6	6	13	13	4	4
23 May 2012	GMS	33	27	6	6	13	12	3	6
23 May 2012	Allensbach	35.5	30.0	4.5	5.5	14.0	7.0	3.5	5.5
22 May 2012	INSA	33	32	4	6	14	8	3	1
20 May 2012	Emnid	35	27	5	6	12	11	4	8
18 May 2012	Infratest	33	30	5	5	13	11	3	3
16 May 2012	FGW	35	30	4	5	13	9	4	5
15 May 2012	Forsa	35	26	5	6	13	12	3	9
15 May 2012	INSA	34	29	5	6	14	9	3	5
12 May 2012	Emnid	34	27	4	7	13	11	4	7
9 May 2012	Forsa	36	26	4	7	13	11	3	10
9 May 2012	INSA	35	27	5	6	15	8	4	8
6 May 2012	Emnid	34	27	5	7	13	11	3	7
3 May 2012	Infratest	34	28	4	6	14	11	3	6
2 May 2012	Forsa	36	25	4	8	12	11	4	11
1 May 2012	INSA	36	27	4	7	13	9	4	9
29 Apr 2012	Emnid	35	26	5	7	13	11	3	9
27 Apr 2012	FGW	35	29	3	6	14	9	4	6
25 Apr 2012	Forsa	35	24	5	7	12	13	4	11
23 Apr 2012	INSA	35	26	4	6	15	10	4	9
23 Apr 2012	GMS	35	26	5	6	13	12	3	9
22 Apr 2012	Emnid	34	27	4	7	13	12	3	7
18 Apr 2012	Forsa	35	25	5	7	12	13	3	10
18 Apr 2012	Allensbach	34.5	28.0	3.5	7.0	14.0	10.0	3.0	6.5
16 Apr 2012	INSA	36	27	4	7	13	9	4	9
15 Apr 2012	Emnid	35	26	4	7	12	12	4	9
13 Apr 2012	Infratest	35	27	3	6	14	11	4	8
11 Apr 2012	INSA	35	28	4	7	13	9	4	7
9 Apr 2012	Forsa	36	24	5	8	11	13	3	12
8 Apr 2012	Emnid	36	26	4	7	13	10	4	10
4 Apr 2012	Infratest	35	27	3	7	14	10	4	8
3 Apr 2012	INSA	36	29	4	6	14	8	3	7
1 Apr 2012	Forsa	35	25	3	9	13	12	3	10
1 Apr 2012	Emnid	36	27	4	7	13	9	4	9
30 Mar 2012	FGW	36	29	3	7	14	8	3	7
28 Mar 2012	Forsa	36	26	4	9	14	7	4	10
27 Mar 2012	INSA	36	29	4	7	15	6	3	7
25 Mar 2012	Emnid	35	28	4	7	15	7	4	7
22 Mar 2012	GMS	37	27	4	8	14	6	4	10
21 Mar 2012	Forsa	36	26	3	9	15	6	5	10
21 Mar 2012	Allensbach	35.0	30.0	3.5	7.0	16.0	5.0	3.5	5.0
18 Mar 2012	Emnid	35	27	4	8	14	8	4	8
16 Mar 2012	Infratest	37	30	3	7	13	6	4	7
14 Mar 2012	Forsa	36	26	3	9	15	7	4	10
11 Mar 2012	Emnid	36	28	3	7	14	8	4	8
9 Mar 2012	FGW	36	30	3	7	14	6	4	6
7 Mar 2012	Forsa	37	26	3	8	15	7	4	11
4 Mar 2012	Emnid	35	28	3	7	14	9	3	7
1 Mar 2012	Infratest	37	28	3	7	14	7	4	9
29 Feb 2012	Forsa	38	26	3	8	14	7	4	12
26 Feb 2012	Emnid	35	27	3	8	15	9	3	8
23 Feb 2012	GMS	38	26	3	7	15	7	4	12
22 Feb 2012	Forsa	38	25	2	8	15	8	4	13
22 Feb 2012	Allensbach	36.0	28.0	4.5	7.5	15.5	5.0	3.5	8.0
19 Feb 2012	Emnid	35	28	3	7	14	9	4	7
17 Feb 2012	Infratest	36	29	3	7	16	6	3	7
15 Feb 2012	Forsa	38	26	2	9	13	7	5	12
12 Feb 2012	Emnid	36	27	3	8	14	7	5	9
10 Feb 2012	FGW	37	29	3	7	14	6	4	8
8 Feb 2012	Forsa	38	27	3	8	13	7	4	11
05 Feb 2012	Emnid	35	28	3	7	14	8	5	7
02 Feb 2012	Infratest	36	29	3	7	15	6	4	7
01 Feb 2012	Forsa	36	27	3	8	15	7	4	9
29 Jan 2012	Emnid	34	29	3	7	15	8	4	5
27 Jan 2012	FGW	36	30	3	7	16	5	3	6
26 Jan 2012	GMS	36	29	3	7	15	6	4	7
25 Jan 2012	Forsa	36	27	3	7	15	7	5	9
25 Jan 2012	Allensbach	35.0	29.0	4.0	7.0	16.5	4.0	4.5	6.0
22 Jan 2012	Emnid	35	29	3	7	15	7	4	6
19 Jan 2012	Infratest	36	29	3	7	15	6	4	7
18 Jan 2012	Forsa	35	27	3	7	15	8	5	8
15 Jan 2012	Emnid	35	29	3	7	16	7	3	6
13 Jan 2012	FGW	36	31	4	6	15	4	4	5
11 Jan 2012	Forsa	36	26	2	7	16	8	5	10
08 Jan 2012	Emnid	35	29	3	7	16	7	3	6
05 Jan 2012	Infratest	35	30	2	6	16	6	5	5
04 Jan 2012	Forsa	35	27	3	8	14	8	5	8

=== 2011 ===
Date	Polling Firm	Union	SPD	FDP	Linke	Grüne	Piraten	Others	Lead
28 Dec 2011	Forsa	35	28	3	8	14	7	5	7
25 Dec 2011	Emnid	35	30	3	7	15	7	3	5
23 Dec 2011	Infratest	36	30	3	6	16	6	3	6
21 Dec 2011	Forsa	35	28	2	7	14	9	5	7
18 Dec 2011	Emnid	34	30	3	7	15	7	4	4
16 Dec 2011	FGW	34	31	4	6	17	4	4	3
14 Dec 2011	Forsa	35	28	3	8	14	7	5	7
13 Dec 2011	GMS	34	30	3	7	15	6	5	4
13 Dec 2011	Allensbach	34.0	30.0	4.0	7.0	16.0	5.0	4.0	4.0
11 Dec 2011	Emnid	35	30	3	7	14	7	4	5
7 Dec 2011	Forsa	35	26	3	9	16	6	5	9
4 Dec 2011	Emnid	34	28	3	8	15	7	5	6
1 Dec 2011	Infratest	35	30	3	7	16	6	3	5
30 Nov 2011	Forsa	35	25	3	9	16	7	5	10
27 Nov 2011	Emnid	34	29	3	8	15	7	4	5
25 Nov 2011	FGW	35	30	4	6	16	5	4	5
25 Nov 2011	Infratest	35	30	3	7	14	7	4	5
24 Nov 2011	GMS	34	28	3	8	17	6	4	6
23 Nov 2011	Forsa	36	26	3	8	14	8	5	10
20 Nov 2011	Emnid	33	30	3	8	16	7	3	3
16 Nov 2011	Forsa	34	26	2	9	15	9	5	8
16 Nov 2011	Allensbach	32.0	30.0	4.5	8.0	17.0	4.5	4.0	2.0
13 Nov 2011	Emnid	33	30	4	8	15	7	3	3
11 Nov 2011	FGW	34	30	4	7	17	5	3	4
9 Nov 2011	Forsa	33	28	3	8	15	8	5	5
6 Nov 2011	Emnid	32	29	4	8	15	8	4	3
3 Nov 2011	Infratest	34	31	4	6	15	7	3	3
2 Nov 2011	Forsa	32	28	3	8	16	9	4	4
30 Oct 2011	Emnid	30	28	3	8	17	10	4	2
28 Oct 2011	FGW	34	31	4	6	16	6	3	3
28 Oct 2011	Infratest	33	32	3	7	14	7	4	1
26 Oct 2011	Forsa	31	27	3	8	16	10	5	4
24 Oct 2011	GMS	33	29	4	6	17	7	4	4
23 Oct 2011	Emnid	32	28	3	7	16	10	4	4
19 Oct 2011	Forsa	31	26	3	8	16	10	6	5
19 Oct 2011	Allensbach	31.0	30.5	4.5	7.5	17.5	5.5	3.5	0.5
16 Oct 2011	Emnid	32	28	4	7	16	9	4	4
14 Oct 2011	FGW	34	30	4	6	16	6	4	4
12 Oct 2011	Forsa	31	27	4	8	17	8	5	4
9 Oct 2011	Emnid	32	28	3	7	17	9	4	4
6 Oct 2011	Infratest	32	30	3	6	17	8	4	2
5 Oct 2011	Forsa	31	28	3	7	17	8	6	3
2 Oct 2011	Emnid	32	28	4	7	17	7	5	4
28 Sep 2011	Forsa	31	29	2	7	19	7	5	2
26 Sep 2011	Infratest	34	30	4	6	18	4	4	4
25 Sep 2011	Emnid	33	30	4	8	18	-	7	3
23 Sep 2011	FGW	34	30	4	6	18	4	4	4
21 Sep 2011	Forsa	31	28	3	9	20	-	9	3
21 Sep 2011	GMS	33	29	4	7	20	-	7	4
21 Sep 2011	Allensbach	33.5	28.5	5.0	8.0	19.0	-	6.0	5.0
18 Sep 2011	Emnid	32	30	4	8	19	-	7	2
16 Sep 2011	Infratest	33	30	5	7	19	-	6	3
14 Sep 2011	Forsa	31	29	4	9	19	-	8	2
11 Sep 2011	Emnid	33	30	4	8	19	-	6	3
9 Sep 2011	Infratest	35	30	3	7	18	-	7	5
9 Sep 2011	FGW	34	30	4	6	20	-	6	4
7 Sep 2011	Forsa	32	27	4	9	19	-	9	5
4 Sep 2011	Emnid	32	28	4	8	21	-	7	4
1 Sep 2011	Infratest	35	28	4	7	20	2	4	7
31 Aug 2011	Forsa	33	25	5	9	21	-	7	8
28 Aug 2011	Emnid	32	28	5	8	20	-	7	4
25 Aug 2011	GMS	34	27	5	7	21	-	6	7
24 Aug 2011	Forsa	32	26	5	8	21	-	8	6
21 Aug 2011	Emnid	31	29	5	8	20	-	7	2
19 Aug 2011	Infratest	34	27	5	7	21	-	6	7
17 Aug 2011	Forsa	32	26	4	9	21	-	8	6
16 Aug 2011	Allensbach	33.0	29.0	4.5	7.5	20.0	-	6.0	4.0
14 Aug 2011	Emnid	33	27	4	9	21	-	6	6
12 Aug 2011	FGW	34	29	4	7	20	-	6	5
10 Aug 2011	Forsa	32	27	3	9	21	-	8	5
7 Aug 2011	Emnid	33	28	5	8	21	-	5	5
4 Aug 2011	Infratest	32	28	4	8	23	-	5	4
3 Aug 2011	Forsa	32	26	3	10	22	-	7	6
31 Jul 2011	Emnid	33	28	4	8	22	-	5	5
27 Jul 2011	Forsa	33	25	3	10	22	-	7	8
24 Jul 2011	Emnid	33	27	4	9	22	-	5	6
22 Jul 2011	Infratest	33	27	4	8	23	-	5	6
21 Jul 2011	GMS	32	26	5	8	22	-	7	6
20 Jul 2011	Forsa	32	24	4	9	23	-	8	8
20 Jul 2011	Allensbach	34.0	27.0	5.5	7.5	20.0	-	6.0	7.0
17 Jul 2011	Emnid	32	27	5	9	21	-	6	5
15 Jul 2011	FGW	33	29	4	7	22	-	5	4
13 Jul 2011	Forsa	31	24	4	10	23	-	8	7
10 Jul 2011	Emnid	33	27	5	8	21	-	6	6
7 Jul 2011	Infratest	32	26	5	8	23	-	6	6
6 Jul 2011	Forsa	33	23	5	9	23	-	7	10
3 Jul 2011	Emnid	34	26	5	8	21	-	6	8
29 Jun 2011	Forsa	32	23	5	9	24	-	7	8
26 Jun 2011	Emnid	32	26	6	8	22	-	6	6
24 Jun 2011	Infratest	34	26	4	7	23	-	6	8
22 Jun 2011	Allensbach	34.5	27.5	4.5	7.0	21.0	-	5.5	7.0
21 Jun 2011	Forsa	32	23	4	9	25	-	7	7
21 Jun 2011	GMS	33	24	5	8	23	-	7	9
19 Jun 2011	Emnid	32	25	5	9	23	-	6	7
15 Jun 2011	Forsa	31	23	4	9	26	-	7	5
12 Jun 2011	Emnid	34	26	4	8	22	-	6	8
10 Jun 2011	FGW	34	28	4	7	22	-	5	6
9 Jun 2011	Infratest	33	25	5	8	24	-	5	8
8 Jun 2011	Forsa	30	22	5	8	27	-	8	3
5 Jun 2011	Emnid	33	25	5	8	23	-	6	8
31 May 2011	Forsa	30	24	4	8	26	-	8	4
29 May 2011	Emnid	34	26	6	8	21	-	5	8
27 May 2011	FGW	34	28	4	7	22	-	5	6
25 May 2011	Forsa	32	21	5	9	26	-	7	6
22 May 2011	Emnid	34	26	5	8	21	-	6	8
22 May 2011	Infratest	33	26	4	8	23	-	6	7
20 May 2011	GMS	33	24	4	9	23	-	7	9
18 May 2011	Forsa	32	22	3	9	26	-	8	6
18 May 2011	Allensbach	33.0	27.0	5.5	6.5	22.0	-	6.0	6.0
15 May 2011	Emnid	33	24	5	9	22	-	7	9
13 May 2011	Infratest	33	26	5	8	22	-	6	7
11 May 2011	Forsa	31	22	4	9	26	-	8	5
8 May 2011	Emnid	33	24	5	9	23	-	6	9
6 May 2011	FGW	35	26	4	7	23	-	5	9
5 May 2011	Infratest	35	26	4	7	23	-	5	9
4 May 2011	Forsa	31	21	4	8	28	-	8	3
1 May 2011	Emnid	34	24	4	8	24	-	6	10
27 Apr 2011	Forsa	31	22	4	9	27	-	7	4
24 Apr 2011	Emnid	33	25	4	8	23	-	7	8
19 Apr 2011	Forsa	31	23	3	8	28	-	7	3
19 Apr 2011	GMS	33	24	5	8	24	-	6	9
19 Apr 2011	Allensbach	32.0	28.0	5.0	7.0	23.0	-	5.0	4.0
17 Apr 2011	Emnid	32	23	5	9	24	-	7	8
15 Apr 2011	Infratest	33	26	4	8	24	-	5	7
15 Apr 2011	FGW	34	27	4	7	23	-	5	7
13 Apr 2011	Forsa	30	24	4	8	27	-	7	3
10 Apr 2011	Emnid	33	25	4	8	24	-	6	8
7 Apr 2011	Infratest	33	27	5	7	23	-	5	6
6 Apr 2011	Forsa	30	23	3	9	28	-	7	2
3 Apr 2011	Emnid	33	26	5	8	23	-	5	7
1 Apr 2011	FGW	34	28	5	8	19	-	6	6
30 Mar 2011	Forsa	33	25	5	8	21	-	8	8
27 Mar 2011	Emnid	34	27	4	9	20	-	6	7
24 Mar 2011	Infratest	35	27	5	7	21	-	5	8
23 Mar 2011	Forsa	33	25	5	9	20	-	8	8
21 Mar 2011	GMS	34	27	5	8	20	-	6	7
20 Mar 2011	Emnid	34	28	5	9	18	-	6	6
18 Mar 2011	Infratest	35	28	5	7	20	-	5	7
16 Mar 2011	Forsa	36	26	5	9	18	-	6	10
16 Mar 2011	Forsa	36	26	6	10	15	-	7	10
16 Mar 2011	Allensbach	36.5	29.0	6.5	8.0	15.0	-	5.0	7.5
13 Mar 2011	Emnid	35	28	6	10	15	-	6	7
10 Mar 2011	Infratest	35	28	6	9	15	-	7	7
9 Mar 2011	Forsa	36	26	5	10	16	-	7	10
6 Mar 2011	Emnid	33	29	7	9	15	-	7	4
2 Mar 2011	Forsa	34	27	5	10	16	-	8	7
27 Feb 2011	Emnid	35	28	6	9	16	-	6	7
25 Feb 2011	FGW	36	29	5	9	15	-	6	7
24 Feb 2011	Infratest	35	27	6	8	17	-	7	8
23 Feb 2011	Forsa	36	23	5	10	18	-	8	13
23 Feb 2011	Allensbach	36.0	28.5	6.5	7.5	16.5	-	5.0	7.5
20 Feb 2011	Emnid	35	25	6	9	19	-	6	10
18 Feb 2011	Infratest	37	25	5	8	18	-	7	12
18 Feb 2011	GMS	34	26	5	10	19	-	6	8
16 Feb 2011	Forsa	36	22	5	11	19	-	7	14
14 Feb 2011	Infratest	35	26	5	9	19	-	6	9
13 Feb 2011	Emnid	34	25	6	10	19	-	6	9
11 Feb 2011	FGW	36	27	5	9	17	-	6	9
9 Feb 2011	Forsa	36	22	5	10	20	-	7	14
6 Feb 2011	Emnid	35	27	5	10	17	-	6	8
3 Feb 2011	Infratest	36	25	5	8	19	-	7	11
2 Feb 2011	Forsa	36	22	5	9	21	-	7	14
30 Jan 2011	Emnid	36	28	4	9	18	-	5	8
28 Jan 2011	FGW	36	27	5	8	19	-	5	9
26 Jan 2011	Forsa	37	23	4	9	20	-	7	14
25 Jan 2011	Allensbach	34.5	27.5	5.5	8.5	18.0	-	6.0	7.0
24 Jan 2011	GMS	34	27	5	9	19	-	6	7
23 Jan 2011	Emnid	35	27	5	9	19	-	5	8
21 Jan 2011	Infratest	34	28	4	8	19	-	7	6
19 Jan 2011	Forsa	36	24	4	9	20	-	7	12
16 Jan 2011	Emnid	35	26	5	9	19	-	6	9
14 Jan 2011	FGW	35	29	5	8	18	-	5	6
12 Jan 2011	Forsa	35	25	3	9	21	-	7	10
9 Jan 2011	Emnid	35	26	5	9	20	-	5	9
6 Jan 2011	Infratest	36	26	4	9	19	-	6	10
4 Jan 2011	Forsa	34	24	4	11	20	-	7	10

=== 2010 ===
Date	Polling Firm	Union	SPD	FDP	Linke	Grüne	Piraten	Others	Lead
28 Dec 2010	Forsa	34	25	3	11	20	-	7	9
26 Dec 2010	Emnid	34	27	5	10	19	-	5	7
21 Dec 2010	Forsa	35	24	3	11	19	-	8	11
21 Dec 2010	Allensbach	34.0	28.5	6.0	8.0	18.5	-	5.0	5.5
19 Dec 2010	Emnid	34	26	5	10	20	-	5	8
17 Dec 2010	FGW	34	28	5	9	19	-	5	6
16 Dec 2010	GMS	33	27	5	9	20	-	6	6
15 Dec 2010	Forsa	34	24	4	11	20	-	7	10
12 Dec 2010	Emnid	35	25	5	10	19	-	6	10
10 Dec 2010	Infratest	33	27	5	10	20	-	5	6
8 Dec 2010	Forsa	34	23	4	10	21	-	8	11
5 Dec 2010	Emnid	34	24	5	10	20	-	7	10
3 Dec 2010	FGW	34	27	5	9	20	-	5	7
2 Dec 2010	Infratest	32	27	5	10	21	-	5	5
1 Dec 2010	Forsa	34	22	5	10	22	-	7	12
28 Nov 2010	Emnid	33	24	6	9	21	-	7	9
24 Nov 2010	Forsa	34	22	5	10	22	-	7	12
24 Nov 2010	Allensbach	32.0	27.5	6.0	9.0	19.5	-	6.0	4.5
21 Nov 2010	Emnid	32	26	6	10	20	-	6	6
17 Nov 2010	Forsa	33	23	5	11	22	-	6	10
16 Nov 2010	GMS	32	26	5	10	21	-	6	6
14 Nov 2010	Emnid	31	27	5	10	22	-	5	4
12 Nov 2010	Infratest	31	26	5	10	23	-	5	5
12 Nov 2010	FGW	33	28	5	9	20	-	5	5
10 Nov 2010	Emnid	31	27	6	10	21	-	5	4
10 Nov 2010	Forsa	32	23	5	10	23	-	7	9
4 Nov 2010	Infratest	32	27	5	9	22	-	5	5
3 Nov 2010	Emnid	31	25	5	11	22	-	6	6
3 Nov 2010	Forsa	30	23	4	11	24	-	8	6
27 Oct 2010	Emnid	31	25	5	10	22	-	7	6
27 Oct 2010	Forsa	30	23	5	11	24	-	7	6
27 Oct 2010	GMS	32	29	5	9	19	-	6	3
22 Oct 2010	FGW	32	29	5	9	20	-	5	3
20 Oct 2010	Emnid	30	26	5	10	23	-	6	4
20 Oct 2010	Forsa	31	23	4	11	24	-	7	7
20 Oct 2010	Allensbach	30.5	28.0	5.5	9.5	20.5	-	6.0	2.5
15 Oct 2010	Infratest	31	28	5	10	21	-	5	3
13 Oct 2010	Emnid	30	27	5	10	22	-	6	3
13 Oct 2010	Forsa	29	23	4	12	25	-	7	4
7 Oct 2010	Infratest	32	27	5	11	20	-	5	5
6 Oct 2010	Emnid	31	28	6	9	20	-	6	3
6 Oct 2010	Forsa	31	23	5	10	24	-	7	7
1 Oct 2010	FGW	31	30	5	9	19	-	6	1
1 Oct 2010	Infratest	33	29	5	10	18	-	5	4
29 Sep 2010	Emnid	30	28	6	10	20	-	6	2
29 Sep 2010	Forsa	30	25	5	10	23	-	7	5
24 Sep 2010	FGW	31	30	5	9	19	-	6	1
22 Sep 2010	Emnid	31	26	6	11	20	-	6	5
22 Sep 2010	Forsa	29	24	5	10	24	-	8	5
21 Sep 2010	Allensbach	32.5	29.5	6.5	8.0	18.5	-	5.0	3.0
17 Sep 2010	Infratest	32	29	5	10	18	-	6	3
17 Sep 2010	GMS	31	30	5	11	17	-	6	1
15 Sep 2010	Emnid	31	28	6	11	18	-	6	3
15 Sep 2010	Forsa	30	24	5	11	22	-	8	6
10 Sep 2010	FGW	32	31	5	10	17	-	5	1
8 Sep 2010	Emnid	31	28	6	11	19	-	5	3
8 Sep 2010	Forsa	31	25	5	10	21	-	8	6
2 Sep 2010	Infratest	32	30	5	10	17	-	6	2
1 Sep 2010	Emnid	31	30	6	10	18	-	5	1
1 Sep 2010	Forsa	31	27	6	9	19	-	8	4
27 Aug 2010	FGW	33	31	5	10	16	-	5	2
25 Aug 2010	Emnid	31	28	7	10	18	-	6	3
25 Aug 2010	Forsa	30	27	5	11	20	-	7	3
20 Aug 2010	Infratest	31	31	5	10	16	-	7	0
20 Aug 2010	GMS	31	31	5	10	16	-	7	0
18 Aug 2010	Emnid	32	29	6	10	17	-	6	3
18 Aug 2010	Forsa	30	27	4	11	20	-	8	3
17 Aug 2010	Allensbach	31.0	32.0	6.0	8.5	17.0	-	5.5	1.0
11 Aug 2010	Emnid	31	30	6	11	17	-	5	1
11 Aug 2010	Forsa	29	28	5	11	19	-	8	1
5 Aug 2010	Infratest	31	31	5	10	17	-	6	0
4 Aug 2010	Emnid	31	29	7	11	16	-	6	2
4 Aug 2010	Forsa	30	28	5	11	18	-	8	2
28 Jul 2010	Emnid	32	29	6	11	16	-	6	3
28 Jul 2010	Forsa	29	28	5	11	19	-	8	1
23 Jul 2010	Infratest	33	30	5	10	17	-	5	3
21 Jul 2010	Emnid	32	30	5	11	16	-	6	2
21 Jul 2010	Forsa	31	28	4	11	19	-	8	3
21 Jul 2010	GMS	32	30	5	10	16	-	7	2
20 Jul 2010	Allensbach	31.5	31.5	6.5	9.5	15.5	-	5.5	0.0
16 Jul 2010	FGW	33	32	5	10	15	-	5	1
14 Jul 2010	Emnid	31	30	6	11	16	-	6	1
14 Jul 2010	Forsa	31	28	4	11	18	-	8	3
7 Jul 2010	Emnid	31	28	6	11	17	-	7	3
7 Jul 2010	Forsa	31	27	4	12	18	-	8	4
1 Jul 2010	Infratest	33	30	5	10	17	-	5	3
30 Jun 2010	Emnid	32	29	6	12	16	-	5	3
29 Jun 2010	Forsa	32	27	4	11	18	-	8	5
23 Jun 2010	Emnid	32	28	6	13	16	-	5	4
23 Jun 2010	Forsa	30	27	5	12	18	-	8	3
23 Jun 2010	Allensbach	32.0	29.0	7.0	11.0	15.5	-	5.5	3.0
23 Jun 2010	GMS	32	29	6	10	17	-	6	3
18 Jun 2010	FGW	33	31	5	11	15	-	5	2
16 Jun 2010	Emnid	31	29	6	12	15	-	7	2
16 Jun 2010	Forsa	31	26	6	11	18	-	8	5
15 Jun 2010	Infratest	32	29	5	11	17	-	6	3
11 Jun 2010	Infratest	31	29	6	12	16	-	6	2
9 Jun 2010	Emnid	32	27	7	13	15	-	6	5
9 Jun 2010	Forsa	32	26	5	12	18	-	7	6
4 Jun 2010	FGW	34	29	6	10	15	-	6	5
2 Jun 2010	Infratest	32	29	8	10	16	-	5	3
2 Jun 2010	Emnid	31	27	7	13	16	-	6	4
1 Jun 2010	Forsa	30	26	7	13	16	-	8	4
27 May 2010	Infratest	33	27	7	11	16	-	6	6
26 May 2010	Emnid	31	28	8	12	16	-	5	3
26 May 2010	Forsa	32	26	7	12	16	-	7	6
26 May 2010	Allensbach	32.0	28.5	8.5	10.0	14.5	-	6.5	3.5
21 May 2010	FGW	36	27	6	11	14	-	6	9
20 May 2010	GMS	33	28	7	10	16	-	6	5
19 May 2010	Emnid	31	28	8	12	15	-	6	3
19 May 2010	Forsa	32	27	6	11	16	-	8	5
14 May 2010	Infratest	32	28	7	11	17	-	5	4
12 May 2010	Emnid	34	26	8	11	15	-	6	8
11 May 2010	Forsa	35	24	7	12	15	-	7	11
5 May 2010	Emnid	34	26	9	10	16	-	5	8
5 May 2010	Forsa	34	25	8	10	16	-	7	9
29 Apr 2010	Infratest	35	26	8	10	16	-	5	9
28 Apr 2010	Emnid	36	25	9	10	15	-	5	11
28 Apr 2010	Forsa	36	24	8	11	14	-	7	12
28 Apr 2010	Allensbach	35.0	27.5	9.0	9.5	13.5	-	5.5	7.5
23 Apr 2010	FGW	38	26	8	10	13	-	5	12
22 Apr 2010	GMS	35	26	9	9	15	-	6	9
21 Apr 2010	Emnid	35	25	9	11	14	-	6	10
21 Apr 2010	Forsa	36	24	8	10	15	-	7	12
16 Apr 2010	Infratest	36	26	9	10	14	-	5	10
14 Apr 2010	Emnid	35	25	8	12	15	-	5	10
14 Apr 2010	Forsa	36	23	8	11	15	-	7	13
7 Apr 2010	Emnid	34	26	9	12	14	-	5	8
7 Apr 2010	Forsa	34	24	7	12	15	-	8	10
31 Mar 2010	Emnid	35	25	9	12	14	-	5	10
31 Mar 2010	Infratest	35	28	8	10	14	-	5	7
30 Mar 2010	Forsa	34	25	7	12	14	-	8	9
26 Mar 2010	FGW	37	26	9	11	13	-	4	11
25 Mar 2010	GMS	34	26	9	10	15	-	6	8
24 Mar 2010	Forsa	32	25	8	12	15	-	8	7
24 Mar 2010	Emnid	35	25	9	11	14	-	6	10
24 Mar 2010	Allensbach	36.0	25.5	9.0	11.0	13.0	-	5.5	10.5
19 Mar 2010	Infratest	35	27	9	10	14	-	5	8
17 Mar 2010	Forsa	34	23	8	11	16	-	8	11
17 Mar 2010	Emnid	35	24	9	11	15	-	6	11
12 Mar 2010	FGW	36	25	10	10	14	-	5	11
10 Mar 2010	Forsa	33	23	8	12	16	-	8	10
10 Mar 2010	Emnid	34	25	10	12	14	-	5	9
4 Mar 2010	Infratest	36	25	10	11	14	-	4	11
3 Mar 2010	Forsa	35	22	9	11	16	-	7	13
3 Mar 2010	Emnid	34	24	10	12	15	-	5	10
1 Mar 2010	GMS	35	25	10	9	15	-	6	10
26 Feb 2010	FGW	36	25	10	10	14	-	5	11
24 Feb 2010	Forsa	35	22	8	12	16	-	7	13
24 Feb 2010	Emnid	34	25	10	12	14	-	5	9
23 Feb 2010	Allensbach	37.0	23.5	10.5	10.5	13.5	-	5.0	13.5
19 Feb 2010	Infratest	34	27	10	10	15	-	4	7
17 Feb 2010	Forsa	35	22	7	12	17	-	7	13
17 Feb 2010	Emnid	35	24	9	12	15	-	5	11
10 Feb 2010	Forsa	34	22	8	11	17	-	8	12
10 Feb 2010	Emnid	36	25	9	11	14	-	5	11
4 Feb 2010	Infratest	36	26	8	11	15	-	4	10
3 Feb 2010	Forsa	36	22	9	11	16	-	6	14
3 Feb 2010	Emnid	36	25	10	11	12	-	6	11
29 Jan 2010	FGW	37	26	10	10	12	-	5	11
27 Jan 2010	Forsa	36	21	9	11	16	-	7	15
27 Jan 2010	Emnid	35	24	10	12	13	-	6	11
27 Jan 2010	Allensbach	34.5	25.0	13.0	11.0	11.5	-	5.0	9.5
22 Jan 2010	Infratest	36	25	10	11	13	-	5	11
20 Jan 2010	Forsa	35	21	11	11	15	-	7	14
20 Jan 2010	Emnid	35	24	11	11	13	-	6	11
19 Jan 2010	GMS	35	24	11	11	14	-	5	11
15 Jan 2010	FGW	36	25	11	11	12	-	5	11
13 Jan 2010	Forsa	35	22	10	11	14	-	8	13
13 Jan 2010	Emnid	34	23	12	12	13	-	6	11
7 Jan 2010	Infratest	36	25	11	10	12	-	6	11
6 Jan 2010	Forsa	35	22	12	11	13	-	7	13

=== 2009 ===
Date	Polling Firm	Union	SPD	FDP	Linke	Grüne	Piraten	Others	Lead
28 Dec 2009	Forsa	35	22	12	12	12	-	7	13
23 Dec 2009	Emnid	34	24	12	12	12	-	6	10
21 Dec 2009	Forsa	35	21	12	11	13	-	8	14
16 Dec 2009	Forsa	37	19	11	12	13	-	8	18
16 Dec 2009	Emnid	34	23	12	12	13	-	6	11
16 Dec 2009	Allensbach	34.5	24.0	13.5	12.0	11.0	-	5.0	10.5
14 Dec 2009	GMS	35	24	12	11	13	-	5	11
11 Dec 2009	Infratest	35	24	12	11	14	-	4	11
11 Dec 2009	FGW	35	25	12	11	11	-	6	10
9 Dec 2009	Forsa	36	20	12	12	13	-	7	16
9 Dec 2009	Emnid	34	23	12	12	13	-	6	11
3 Dec 2009	Infratest	35	24	12	11	13	-	5	11
2 Dec 2009	Forsa	37	20	12	11	13	-	7	17
2 Dec 2009	Emnid	35	23	12	12	12	-	6	12
27 Nov 2009	FGW	35	24	13	12	10	-	6	11
25 Nov 2009	Forsa	37	19	12	12	13	-	7	18
25 Nov 2009	Emnid	34	23	13	13	12	-	5	11
25 Nov 2009	Allensbach	35.5	23.0	14.0	11.5	11.0	-	5.0	12.5
20 Nov 2009	Infratest	35	22	13	12	12	-	6	13
19 Nov 2009	GMS	35	21	13	13	12	-	6	14
18 Nov 2009	Forsa	36	20	13	12	12	-	7	16
18 Nov 2009	Emnid	34	22	12	13	13	-	6	12
13 Nov 2009	Infratest	35	21	13	12	13	-	6	14
11 Nov 2009	Forsa	36	20	13	12	12	-	7	16
11 Nov 2009	Emnid	34	21	13	13	13	-	6	13
5 Nov 2009	Infratest	35	22	14	12	12	-	5	13
4 Nov 2009	Forsa	36	21	12	12	12	-	7	15
4 Nov 2009	Emnid	33	22	14	13	13	-	5	11
30 Oct 2009	FGW	36	22	13	13	11	-	5	14
28 Oct 2009	Forsa	35	20	15	12	12	-	6	15
28 Oct 2009	Emnid	34	21	14	14	12	-	5	13
28 Oct 2009	Allensbach	35.0	23.0	14.0	12.0	10.5	-	5.5	12.0
23 Oct 2009	GMS	35	21	14	14	11	-	5	14
21 Oct 2009	Forsa	35	20	16	13	10	-	6	15
21 Oct 2009	Emnid	34	21	14	13	12	-	6	13
16 Oct 2009	Infratest	34	22	14	13	12	-	5	12
16 Oct 2009	FGW	35	22	14	13	11	-	5	13
14 Oct 2009	Forsa	34	20	16	13	11	-	6	14
14 Oct 2009	Emnid	34	20	15	14	11	-	6	14
8 Oct 2009	Infratest	34	23	14	13	11	-	5	11
7 Oct 2009	Forsa	35	22	14	13	10	-	6	13
7 Oct 2009	Emnid	33	21	15	14	11	-	6	12
2 Oct 2009	FGW	35	22	14	13	11	-	5	13
27 Sep 2009	Election Results	33.8	23.0	14.6	11.9	10.7	2.0	4.0	10.8

== Preferred Chancellor ==
Polling since Peer Steinbrück was chosen as Kanzlerkandidat for the SPD on 28 September 2012.

Institute	Date	Merkel	Steinbrück
Forschungsgruppe Wahlen	19 September 2013	58%	32%
Forschungsgruppe Wahlen	13 September 2013	59%	32%
Infratest Dimap	12 September 2013	49%	32%
Forschungsgruppe Wahlen	5 September 2013	59%	30%
Infratest Dimap	5 September 2013	54%	34%
Infratest Dimap	29 August 2013	54%	28%
Forschungsgruppe Wahlen	28 August 2013	60%	31%
Forschungsgruppe Wahlen	23 August 2013	63%	29%
Forschungsgruppe Wahlen	16 August 2013	63%	29%
Infratest Dimap	15 August 2013	55%	22%
Forschungsgruppe Wahlen	2 August 2013	60%	31%
Infratest Dimap	1 August 2013	60%	28%
Forschungsgruppe Wahlen	12 July 2013	62%	29%
Infratest Dimap	4 July 2013	58%	27%
Forschungsgruppe Wahlen	28 June 2013	65%	27%
Forschungsgruppe Wahlen	7 June 2013	59%	30%
Infratest Dimap	6 June 2013	57%	30%
Infratest Dimap	2 May 2013	59%	28%
Infratest Dimap	4 April 2013	60%	25%
Forschungsgruppe Wahlen	22 March 2013	60%	29%
Forsa	13 March 2013	58%	20%
Forschungsgruppe Wahlen	8 March 2013	62%	27%
Infratest Dimap	7 March 2013	58%	26%
Forsa	6 March 2013	57%	20%
Forsa	27 February 2013	56%	19%
Forschungsgruppe Wahlen	22 February 2013	62%	28%
Forsa	20 February 2013	59%	19%
Forsa	13 February 2013	59%	19%
Forsa	6 February 2013	58%	21%
Infratest Dimap	31 January 2013	59%	28%
Forsa	30 January 2013	58%	20%
INSA/YouGov	15 January 2013	43%	15%
Forschungsgruppe Wahlen	25 January 2013	62%	29%
Forsa	23 January 2013	59%	18%
Forsa	16 January 2013	59%	18%
Forschungsgruppe Wahlen	11 January 2013	65%	25%
Infratest Dimap	10 January 2013	55%	30%
Forsa	9 January 2013	58%	22%
Forsa	26 December 2012	51%	26%
Forsa	19 December 2012	50%	27%
Forschungsgruppe Wahlen	14 December 2012	54%	36%
Forsa	12 December 2012	51%	26%
Infratest dimap	6 December 2012	49%	39%
Forsa	5 December 2012	50%	26%
Emnid	2 December 2012	57%	28%
Forschungsgruppe Wahlen	30 November 2012	52%	38%
Forsa	28 November 2012	51%	25%
Forsa	21 November 2012	50%	26%
Forschungsgruppe Wahlen	16 November 2012	53%	38%
Forsa	14 November 2012	53%	26%
Infratest dimap	8 November 2012	53%	36%
Forsa	7 November 2012	50%	29%
Emnid	4 November 2012	51%	26%
Forsa	30 October 2012	49%	28%
Forschungsgruppe Wahlen	26 October 2012	52%	37%
Forsa	24 October 2012	46%	29%
Forsa	17 October 2012	48%	32%
Forschungsgruppe Wahlen	11 October 2012	49%	40%
Forsa	10 October 2012	46%	35%
Infratest dimap	4 October 2012	49%	38%
Forsa	2 October 2012	46%	34%
Emnid	30 September 2012	46%	37%
Infratest dimap	28 September 2012	50%	36%

=== Prior polling ===
Institute	Date	Merkel	Steinmeier	Steinbrück	Gabriel	Fischer	Trittin	Künast
Forsa	7 September 2011	37%	35%	–	–	–	–	–
Forsa	7 September 2011	40%	–	39%	–	–	–	–
Forsa	7 September 2011	52%	–	–	20%	–	–	–
Forsa	20 July 2011	36%	35%	–	–	–	–	–
Forsa	20 July 2011	39%	–	37%	–	–	–	–
Forsa	20 July 2011	49%	–	–	22%	–	–	–
Forsa	27 April 2011	40%	33%	–	–	–	–	–
Forsa	19 April 2011	39%	33%	–	–	–	–	–
Forsa	19 April 2011	49%	–	–	22%	–	–	–
Forsa	19 April 2011	48%	–	–	–	31%	–	–
Forsa	19 April 2011	51%	–	–	–	–	28%	–
Forsa	19 April 2011	52%	–	–	–	–	–	27%
Forsa	13 April 2011	39%	35%	–	–	–	–	–
Forsa	6 April 2011	38%	32%	–	–	–	–	–
Forsa	30 March 2011	40%	32%	–	–	–	–	–
Forsa	23 March 2011	40%	31%	–	–	–	–	–
Forsa	16 March 2011	44%	30%	–	–	–	–	–
Forsa	9 March 2011	44%	29%	–	–	–	–	–
Forsa	2 March 2011	43%	29%	–	–	–	–	–
Forsa	23 February 2011	43%	30%	–	–	–	–	–
Forsa	16 February 2011	42%	32%	–	–	–	–	–
Forsa	9 February 2011	43%	32%	–	–	–	–	–
Forsa	2 February 2011	44%	32%	–	–	–	–	–
Forsa	26 January 2011	43%	32%	–	–	–	–	–
Forsa	19 January 2011	42%	33%	–	–	–	–	–
Forsa	12 January 2011	42%	32%	–	–	–	–	–
Forsa	4 January 2011	43%	33%	–	–	–	–	–

== Preferred coalition ==
Institute	Date	CDU/CSU/ FDP	SPD/GREENS	CDU/CSU/ SPD	CDU/CSU/ GREENS	SPD/GREENS/ LINKE
Forschungsgruppe Wahlen	13 September 2013	19%	16%	29%	–	–
Forschungsgruppe Wahlen	5 September 2013	18%	15%	29%	–	–
Forschungsgruppe Wahlen	29 August 2013	17%	17%	27%	–	–
Forschungsgruppe Wahlen	23 August 2013	18%	20%	27%	–	–
Forschungsgruppe Wahlen	16 August 2013	16%	17%	27%	–	–
Infratest Dimap	16 August 2013	17%	17%	23%	16%	11%
Forschungsgruppe Wahlen	2 August 2013	14%	22%	25%	–	–
Forschungsgruppe Wahlen	12 July 2013	15%	20%	27%	–	–
Forschungsgruppe Wahlen	28 June 2013	19%	19%	23%	–	–
Forschungsgruppe Wahlen	7 June 2013	12%	23%	25%	–	–
Forschungsgruppe Wahlen	17 May 2013	12%	25%	24%	–	–
Forschungsgruppe Wahlen	26 April 2013	13%	24%	25%	–	–
Forschungsgruppe Wahlen	12 April 2013	13%	21%	24%	–	–
Forschungsgruppe Wahlen	22 March 2013	13%	24%	23%	–	–
Forschungsgruppe Wahlen	8 March 2013	13%	22%	24%	–	–
Forschungsgruppe Wahlen	22 February 2013	11%	25%	26%	–	–
Forschungsgruppe Wahlen	25 January 2013	17%	29%	22%	–	–
Forschungsgruppe Wahlen	11 January 2013	11%	21%	27%	–	–
Forschungsgruppe Wahlen	14 December 2012	12%	26%	23%	–	–
Forschungsgruppe Wahlen	30 November 2012	9%	28%	23%	–	–
Forschungsgruppe Wahlen	19 November 2012	8%	28%	24%	–	–
Forschungsgruppe Wahlen	26 October 2012	8%	23%	28%	–	–
Forschungsgruppe Wahlen	11 October 2012	7%	23%	30%	–	–
Forschungsgruppe Wahlen	28 September 2012	10%	22%	32%	–	–
Forschungsgruppe Wahlen	14 September 2012	7%	21%	31%	–	–
Forschungsgruppe Wahlen	24 August 2012	9%	24%	27%	–	–
Forschungsgruppe Wahlen	13 July 2012	6%	24%	27%	–	–
Forschungsgruppe Wahlen	15 June 2012	6%	24%	26%	–	–
Forschungsgruppe Wahlen	25 May 2012	8%	26%	25%	–	–
Forschungsgruppe Wahlen	16 May 2012	9%	28%	22%	–	–
Forschungsgruppe Wahlen	27 April 2012	6%	24%	32%	–	–
Forschungsgruppe Wahlen	30 March 2012	5%	21%	31%	–	–
Forschungsgruppe Wahlen	9 March 2012	5%	22%	30%	–	–
Forschungsgruppe Wahlen	10 February 2012	7%	21%	31%	–	–
Forschungsgruppe Wahlen	27 January 2012	5%	20%	34%	–	–
Forschungsgruppe Wahlen	13 January 2012	6%	22%	30%	–	–
Forschungsgruppe Wahlen	10 June 2011	9%	28%	17%	–	–
Forschungsgruppe Wahlen	27 May 2011	9%	28%	19%	–	–
Forschungsgruppe Wahlen	6 May 2011	10%	29%	20%	–	–
Forschungsgruppe Wahlen	15 April 2011	7%	31%	20%	–	–
Emnid	1 April 2011	10%	32%	23%	15%	–
Forschungsgruppe Wahlen	1 April 2011	9%	31%	18%	–	–
Forschungsgruppe Wahlen	25 February 2011	15%	24%	19%	–	–
Forschungsgruppe Wahlen	11 February 2011	10%	23%	20%	–	–
Forschungsgruppe Wahlen	28 January 2011	12%	22%	21%	–	–
Forschungsgruppe Wahlen	14 January 2011	11%	24%	22%	–	–
Forschungsgruppe Wahlen	26 March 2010	15%	15%	24%	–	–
Forschungsgruppe Wahlen	12 March 2010	16%	15%	21%	–	–
Forschungsgruppe Wahlen	26 February 2010	14%	16%	19%	–	–
Forschungsgruppe Wahlen	29 January 2010	20%	14%	15%	–	–
Forschungsgruppe Wahlen	15 January 2010	21%	14%	17%	–	–
Forschungsgruppe Wahlen	11 December 2009	24%	14%	15%	–	–
Forschungsgruppe Wahlen	27 November 2009	24%	13%	15%	–	–

== See also ==
- Opinion polling for the 2017 German federal election
- Opinion polling for the 2021 German federal election
