= Trademark look =

Well-recognized fashion or posture choice

Trademark look or signature look is the characteristic clothes or other distinguishing signs used by a certain character or performer, making the person more recognizable by the audience. Politicians may also have trademark signs, such as the suit of American President Barack Obama or the Merkel-Raute hand gesture of German Chancellor Angela Merkel. It can also refer to the clothes of a certain subculture.

Some trademark signatures may have started as in-jokes, but have then come to have been recognized by a wider audience.

Popular personalities like Steve Jobs and Mark Zuckerberg are known for their simple signature looks. The reason shared is to save on the amount of time spent on deciding what to wear daily. As fashion trends are influenced by well-known individuals, more and more people have started to find their own personal signature style. Sometimes, when a celebrity stops using their trademark look, people might even find it hard to recognize them.

The term "trademark look" (or anything similar) is not used in trademark law, and a trademark look is not necessarily trademark-protected in itself.

== See also ==
- Catchphrase
- Leitmotif
- Signature song
- Signature weapon
- Trope (literature)
- List of filmmakers' signatures
