= Merkel-Raute =

Hand gesture

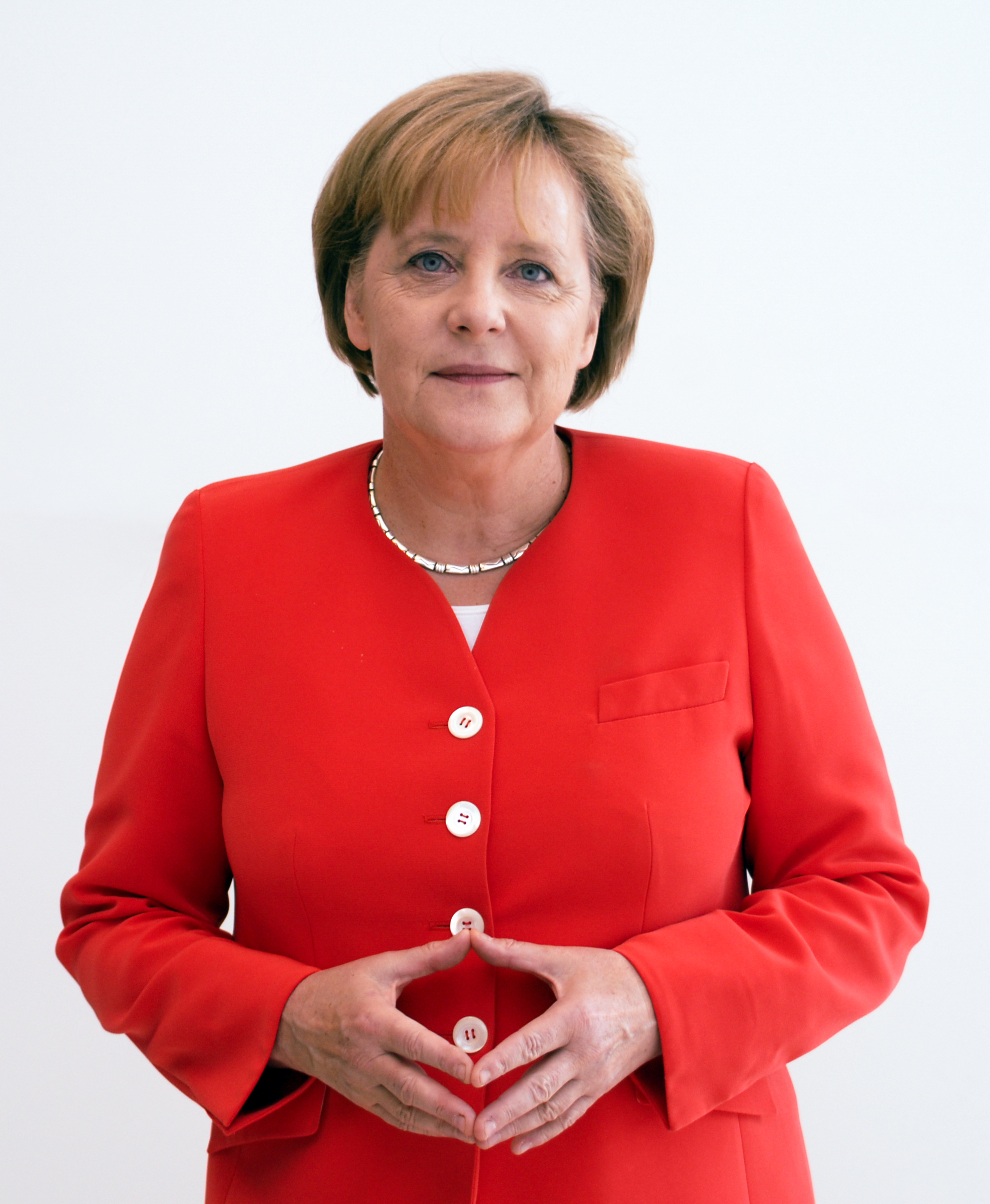
Former Chancellor Angela Merkel showing her trademark gesture at official portrait photograph, 2010

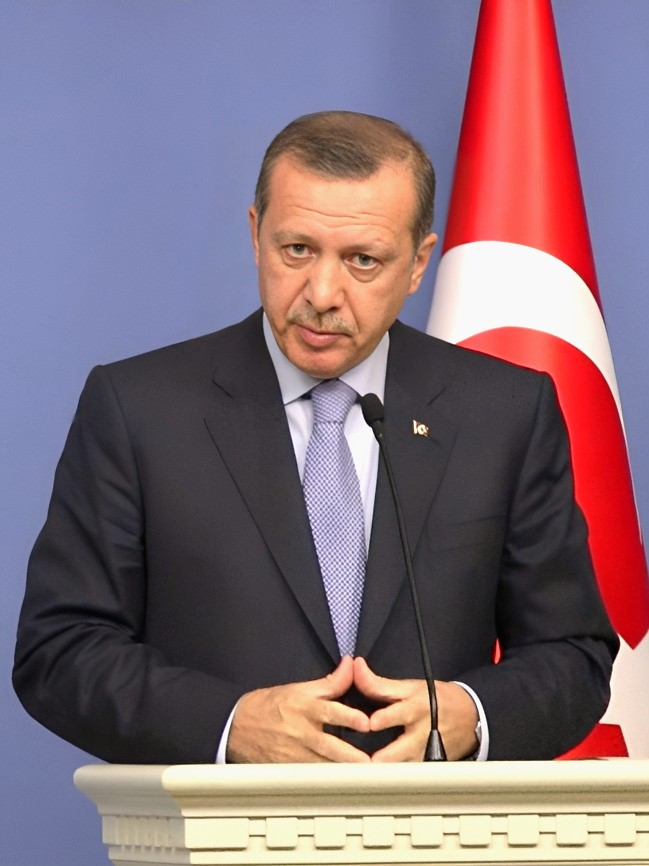
Turkish Prime Minister Recep Tayyip Erdoğan using "triangle of power" during the press conference, 2012

The Merkel-Raute (German for "Merkel rhombus"), termed the Merkel diamond, Triangle of Power, or simply, Merkel Hands, by English-speaking media, is a hand gesture made by resting one's hands in front of the abdomen so that the fingertips meet, with the thumbs and index fingers forming a rough quadrangular shape. This signature gesture of Angela Merkel, former Chancellor of Germany, has been described as "probably one of the most recognisable hand gestures in the world".

Asked about how the Merkel-Raute was introduced as her trademark, Merkel stated that "there was always the question, what to do with your arms, and that's how it came about." She chose the gesture without having been assisted by a counsellor because "it contains a certain symmetry".

== Use by supporters and opponents ==
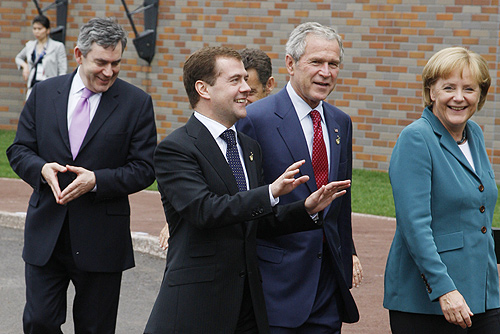
Then-British Prime Minister Gordon Brown (left) during the 34th G8 summit in 2008, with his hands similarly positioned

The stereotypical gesture was originally used in order to ridicule Angela Merkel and her government. Most notably, it is found with comedians impersonating her, combined with the colorful jackets she is usually seen wearing. In Jan Philipp Gloger's staging of The Flying Dutchman, which premiered during the 2013 Bayreuth Festival, the Merkel-Raute is used as a criticism of capitalism: During the performance, the gesture is shown as the distinctive mark of a nameless, synchronized elite of bankers and managers.

When used by her own party (the conservative Christian Democratic Union), the gesture was intended as a political symbol for Merkel's (presumed) unagitated leadership. On 2 September 2013, near the climax of the campaign for the 2013 federal election, the CDU unveiled a giant banner greeting travellers at Berlin Hauptbahnhof, which was displayed on two sides of a hotel building under construction, taking up a total space of nearly 2,400 square metres (26,000 sq ft). The photographic mosaic was made up of 2,150 images of the hands of CDU supporters and shows nothing but Merkel's hands forming the Raute, next to the slogan "(Put) Germany's future in good hands" (German: Deutschlands Zukunft in guten Händen). According to Hermann Gröhe, the manager of the CDU election campaign, the billboard would perfectly "embody our election message".

Politicians of the opposition criticised the giant campaigning billboard as an instance of a "monstrous cult of personality", calling it "Cuban-style". Berlin-based newspaper Der Tagesspiegel used the childless Merkel's nickname Mutti ("mommy") in conjunction with Kurt Tucholsky's poem Mutters Hände ("Mother's Hands", which describes the hands of an old, dying woman) to imply that it was unfavorable for politicians to be characterized by just one hand gesture.

In addition to the billboard, the Merkel-Raute was also employed in the CDU's other campaigning efforts. The Young Union (Junge Union or JU in German), the youth wing of the CDU, organised flashmobs in which members gathered in a circle while imitating the gesture in several public places in Germany. It also produced posters featuring a stylised version of the Merkel-Raute above the words "Cool bleiben und Kanzlerin wählen" ("Keep calm and vote for the Chancellor" or "Stay cool and choose the Chancellor") a play on the British wartime slogan Keep Calm and Carry On; these posters were also made into various articles of clothing, such as T-shirts and hoodies. This stylised version had also been used by teAM Deutschland, the CDU's campaign team, to represent Merkel on its website as early as March 2013. Also, the Association of Christian Democratic Students (Ring Christlich-Demokratischer Studenten or RCDS in German), a student organisation associated with the CDU, created the website "Studenten für Merkel" ("Students for Merkel") featuring photographs of university students imitating the Merkel-Raute with the slogan "Ich wähle Angie! Und du?" ("I'm voting for Angie! And you?"), to which readers were encouraged to upload their own photographs.

The CDU has brought back the Merkel-Raute for its 2017 election campaign as well. The Raute features prominently in its website for supporters, "Ich unterstütze Merkel" ("I support Merkel"). The website uses the slogan "I love Raute", along with a logo consisting of "I ❤" followed by a stylised Raute similar to that used by teAM Deutschland in 2013. It encourages supporters to upload photographs of themselves decorated with the aforementioned logo. The CDU has also made items such as pens, cups, stickers, and bags with this logo available for sale on its main website.

== Internet meme ==
Since its installation, the giant CDU campaigning poster has enjoyed prominence on the Internet, especially with the users of social networking services. The releasing of digitally altered images has turned into an Internet meme, most notably featuring Merkel's hands superimposed on images of Mr. Burns (whose trademark is a similar gesture), Grumpy Cat, Spock and others.

The emoticon <> referencing the Merkel-Raute has also been adopted by the CDU as a symbol of Merkel in its Internet communications, even after the end of the 2013 election campaign. For example, it organised a competition on its Facebook page in which people were encouraged to comment with "<>" in order to win a bag printed with the aforementioned campaign poster. It also used the emoticon at the end of its 2013 year-end video montage, as well as in its Twitter congratulations to Merkel on her sixtieth birthday on 17 July 2014.

== See also ==
- Pantone Merkel
