= 2013 German federal election =

- 22 September 2013

All 631 seats in the Bundestag, including 33 overhang and leveling seats 316 seats needed for a majority
- Opinion polls
- Registered: 61,946,900 (▼0.4%)
- Turnout: 71.5% (▲0.7 pp)
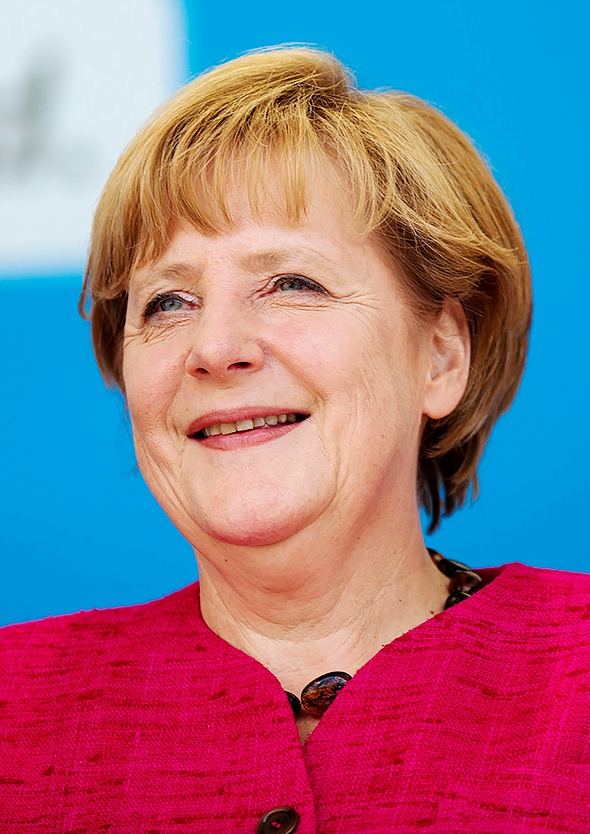

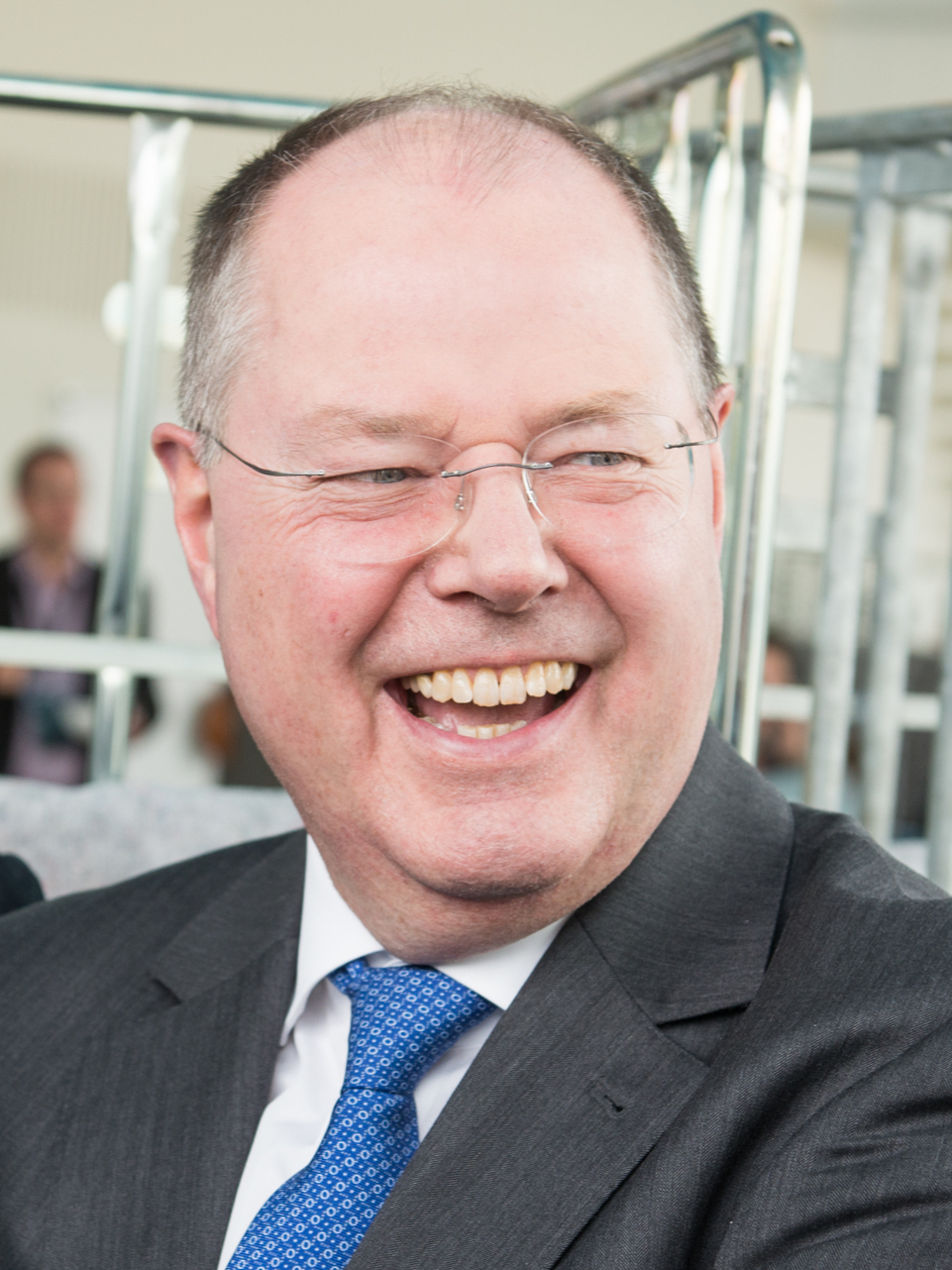

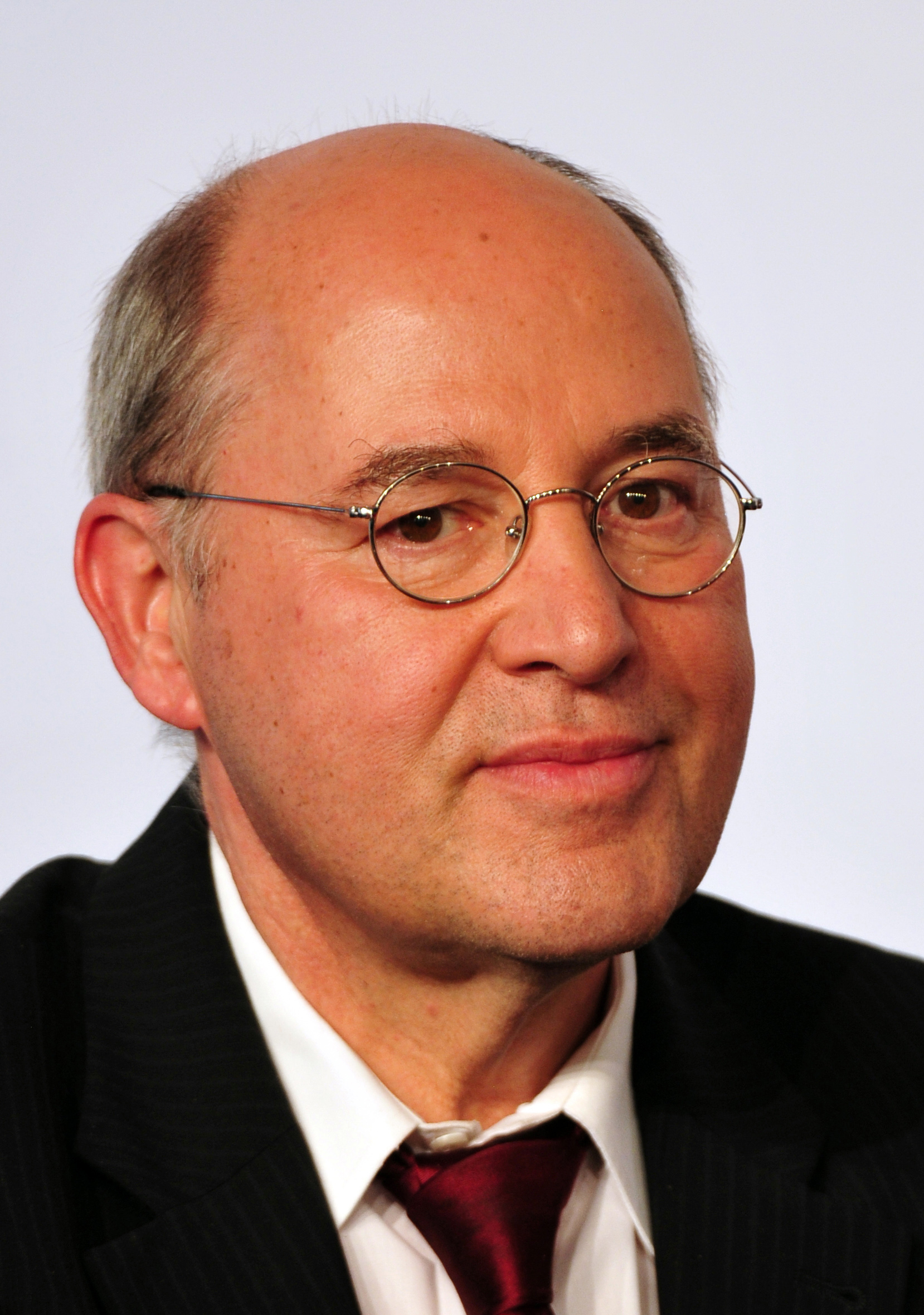

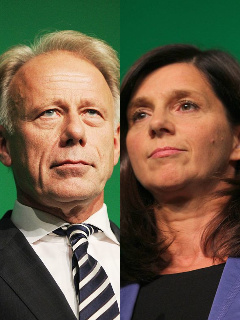

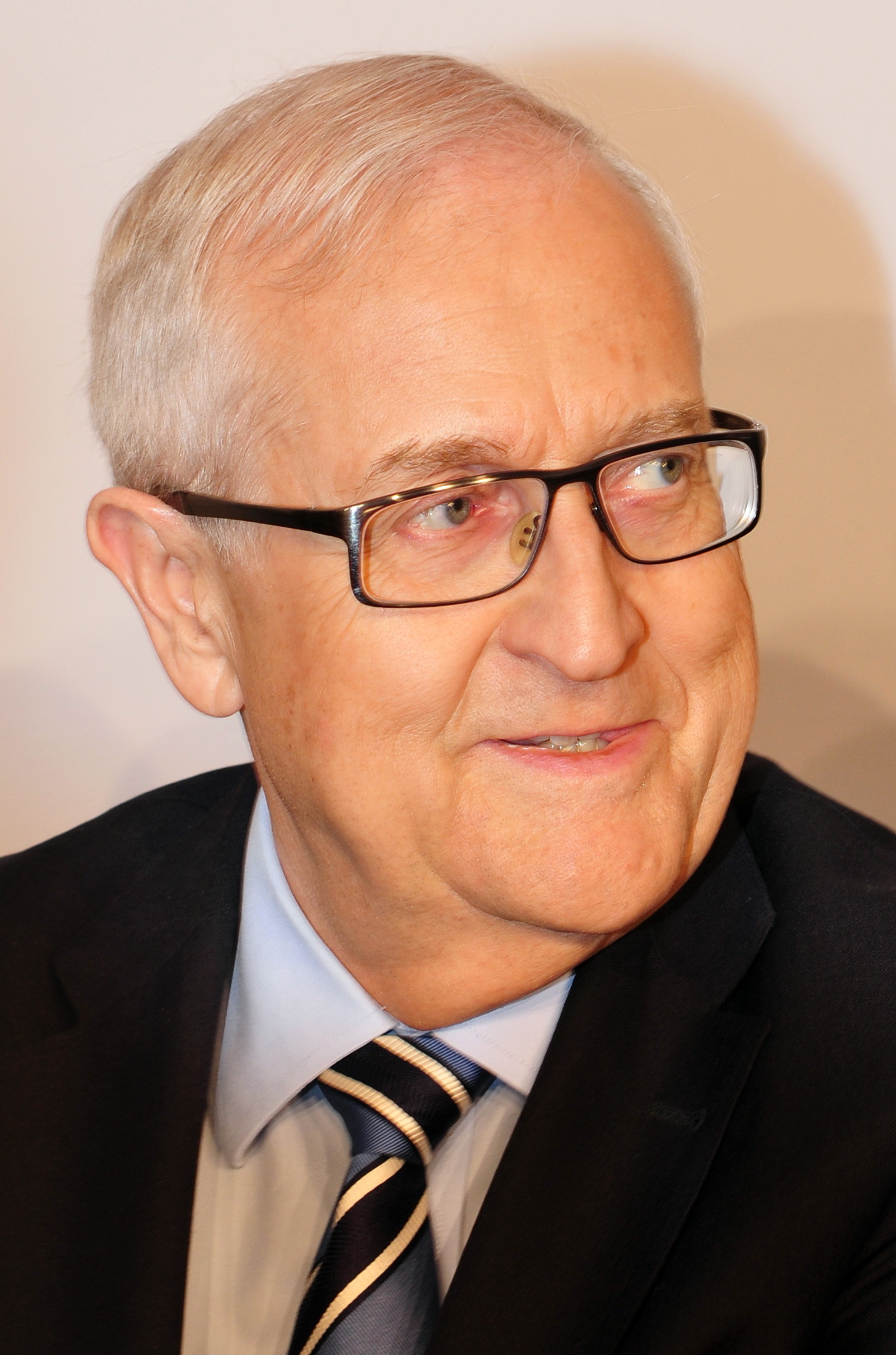

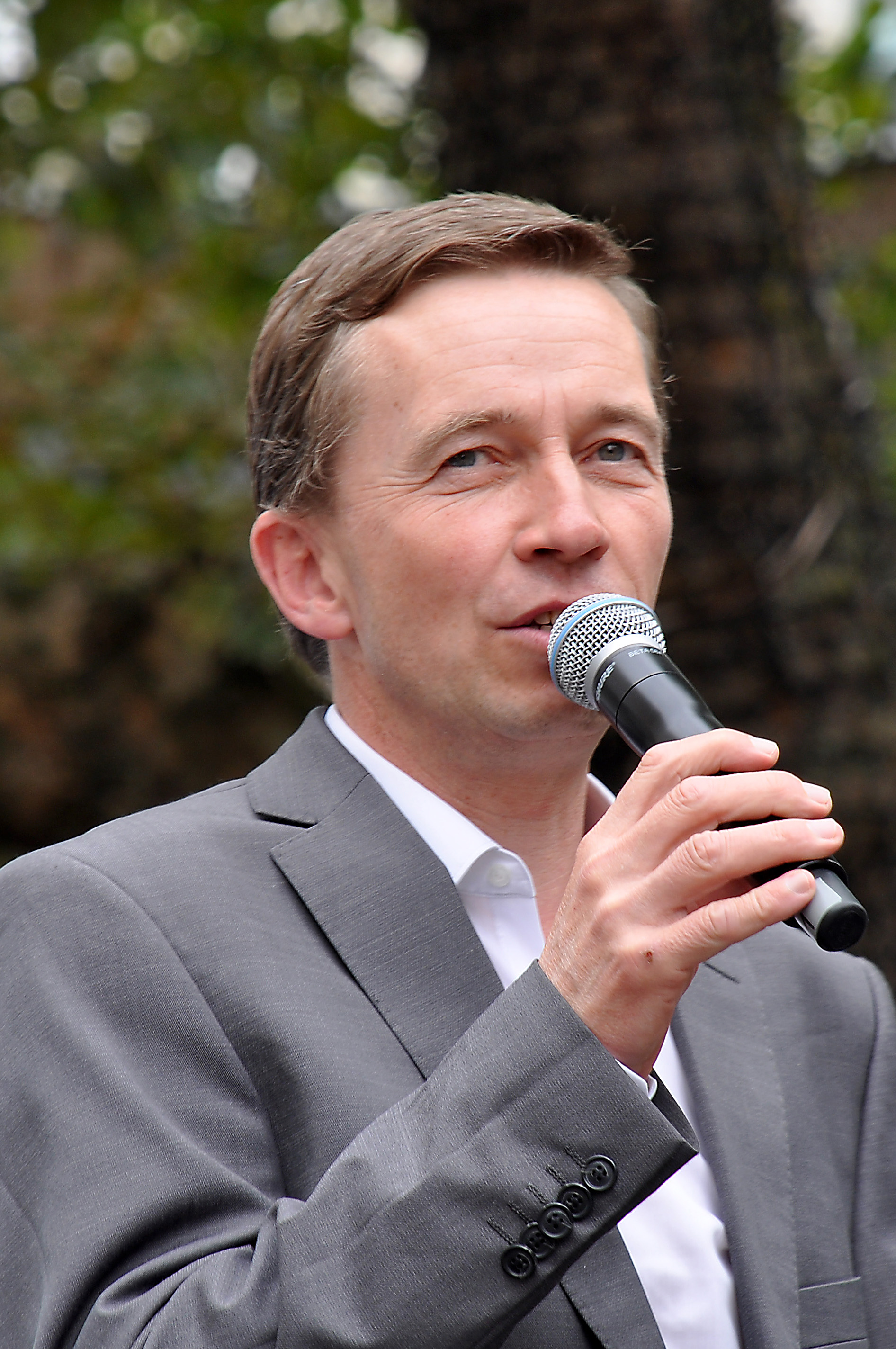
	First party	Second party	Third party
Candidate	Angela Merkel	Peer Steinbrück	Gregor Gysi (Note: Gysi was the leading candidate on a list of 8 top candidates appointed by the party congress. The others were Sahra Wagenknecht, Jan van Aken, Dietmar Bartsch, Klaus Ernst, Nicole Gohlke, Diana Golze, and Caren Lay.)
Party	CDU/CSU	SPD	Left
Last election	33.8%, 239 seats	23.0%, 146 seats	11.9%, 76 seats
Seats won	311	193	64
Seat change	▲72	▲47	▼12
Popular vote	18,165,446	11,252,215	3,755,699
Percentage	41.5%	25.7%	8.6%
Swing	▲7.7 pp	▲2.7 pp	▼3.3 pp
	Fourth party	Fifth party	Sixth party
Candidate	Jürgen Trittin & Katrin Göring-Eckardt	Rainer Brüderle	Bernd Lucke
Party	Greens	FDP	AfD
Last election	10.7%, 68 seats	14.6%, 93 seats	Did not exist
Seats won	63	0	0
Seat change	▼5	▼93	New party
Popular vote	3,694,057	2,083,533	2,056,985
Percentage	8.4%	4.8%	4.7%
Swing	▼2.3 pp	▼9.8 pp	New party
- Results of the election. The main map shows constituency winners, and results for the proportional list seats are shown in the bottom left.
Government before election
Second Merkel cabinet
CDU/CSU-FDP
Government after election
Third Merkel cabinet
CDU/CSU–SPD

A federal election was held on 22 September to elect the members of the 18th Bundestag of Germany. At stake were all 598 seats to the Bundestag, plus 33 overhang seats determined thereafter. The Christian Democratic Union of Germany/Christian Social Union of Bavaria (CDU/CSU) of incumbent chancellor Angela Merkel won their best result since 1990 with nearly 42% of the vote and nearly 50% of the seats, just five short for an overall majority. The co-governing Free Democratic Party (FDP) failed to meet the 5% vote electoral threshold in what was their worst showing ever in a federal election at the time, the electoral wipeout denying them seats in the Bundestag for the first time in their history.

As the CDU/CSU's narrowly missed a majority, and the FDP failed to get any seats, any prospective government was required to be a new coalition. The only possible coalition government excluding the CDU/CSU would have been an all-left-wing red–red–green coalition, since a red–green alliance, similar to the German government between 1998 and 2005, would not have enough seats for a majority. Both the Social Democratic Party of Germany (SPD) and Alliance 90/The Greens ruled out governing with The Left that had ruled former East Germany. Ultimately, Merkel's party reached a coalition agreement with the then-main opposition party, the SPD, to form another grand coalition, the third in the country's history since World War II. The SPD leadership conducted a ratification vote by their broader membership before the agreement was made final. This grand coalition was renewed after the 2017 German federal election due to failure during the negotiations of a Jamaica coalition.

== Background ==
In the 2009 German federal election, the Christian Democratic Union of Germany (CDU) and its sister party, the Christian Social Union of Bavaria (CSU), and the Free Democratic Party (FDP) won the election with Angela Merkel as Chancellor of Germany and Guido Westerwelle as Vice-Chancellor of Germany.

== Date ==
The date of the federal election is governed by the Basic Law for the Federal Republic of Germany (Germany's constitution) and the Federal Election Law (Bundeswahlgesetz). Article 39 of the Basic Law states that the Bundestag shall be elected between 46 and 48 months after the beginning of the legislative period. As the 17th Bundestag convened on 27 October 2009, the election was scheduled between 27 August and 27 October 2013. To avoid school holidays, a date in late September is usually chosen; this made 15 or 22 September 2013 the most likely dates. The President of Germany ordered 22 September 2013 to be the election day upon the recommendation of the federal government.

Polling stations were open from 8:00 to 18:00.

== Electoral system ==
According to Article 38 of the Basic Law for the Federal Republic of Germany, members of the Bundestag shall be elected in general, direct, free, equal, and secret elections; everyone over the age of eighteen is entitled to vote.

In 2008, some modifications to the electoral system were required under an order of the Federal Constitutional Court of Germany. The court had found a provision in the Federal Election Law by which it was possible for a party to experience a negative vote weight, namely losing seats due to more votes, violated the constitutional guarantee of the electoral system being equal and direct. The court allowed three years for these changes, so the 2009 German federal election was not affected. The changes were due by 30 June 2011 but appropriate legislation was not completed by that deadline. A new electoral law was enacted in late 2011 but was declared unconstitutional once again by the Federal Constitutional Court upon lawsuits from the opposition parties and a group of some 4,000 private citizens.

Four of the five factions in the Bundestag agreed on an electoral reform whereby the number of seats in the Bundestag will be increased as much as necessary to ensure that any overhang seats are compensated through apportioned leveling seats, to ensure full proportionality according to the political party's share of party votes at the national level. The Bundestag approved and enacted the new electoral reform in February 2013.

The Bundestag is elected using mixed-member proportional representation, meaning that each voter has two votes, a first vote for the election of a constituency candidate by first-past-the-post and a second vote for the election of a state list. The Sainte-Laguë/Schepers method is used to convert the votes into seats, in a two-stage process with each stage involving two calculations. First, the number of seats to be allocated to each state is calculated, based on the proportion of the German population living there. Then the seats in each state are allocated to the party lists in that state, based on the proportion of second votes each party received.

In the distribution of seats among state lists, only parties that have obtained at least five percent of the valid second votes cast in the electoral area or have won a seat in at least three constituencies are taken into consideration. The minimum number of seats for each party at federal level is then determined. This is done by calculating, for each party state list, the number of constituency seats it won on the basis of the first votes, as well as the number of seats to which it is entitled on the basis of the second votes. The higher of these two figures is the party's minimum number of seats in that state. Adding together the minimum number of seats to which the party is entitled in all of the states produces a total representing its guaranteed minimum number of seats in the country as a whole.

In order to ensure that each party receives its guaranteed minimum number of seats when the seats are allocated using the Sainte-Laguë/Schepers method, it may become necessary to increase the number of seats in the Bundestag. Then it must be ensured that the seats are distributed to the parties in line with their national share of the second votes. Additional overhang seats, or balance seats, are created to ensure that the distribution of the seats reflects the parties' share of the second votes and that no party receives fewer than its guaranteed minimum number of seats. Balance seats are also necessary to ensure that each party requires roughly the same number of second votes per seat. Once the number of seats which each party is entitled to receive across the country has been determined, the seats are allocated to the parties' individual state lists. Each state list must receive at least as many seats as the number of constituencies which the party won in the state in question.

== Chancellor-candidates ==
Although the chancellor-candidates (Kanzlerkandidaten) play a very important role in election campaigns, their office is not regulated in any law, and it is up to each party to determine how, and if at all, to name a chancellor-candidate. The SPD names a chancellor-candidate, while the CDU and the CSU name a common one. The smaller Bundestag parties (the FDP, the Left, and the Greens) usually do not name a chancellor-candidate as it is very improbable for such a candidate to actually be elected chancellor. They instead name one or two persons (Spitzenkandidaten) who are to become the faces of that party's campaign. Although there is nearly no chance for them to win seats in the Bundestag, especially due to the required minimum quota of votes required to be granted any seats, and much less have their candidate become chancellor, fringe parties sometimes name a chancellor-candidate, such as the Bürgerrechtsbewegung Solidarität with its chancellor-candidate Helga Zepp-LaRouche in the 2009 federal election.

While a sitting chancellor is usually named chancellor-candidate for his or her own party, the main opposition party's process to determine their chancellor-candidate differs. Most times, such a person is determined in an inner party circle and then anointed in a party convention. As the CDU/CSU is the main government party, CDU chairwoman and incumbent chancellor Angela Merkel was not challenged as chancellor-candidate. In the SPD, the situation was a bit less clear, as there were four candidates in the discussion. While the party chairman Sigmar Gabriel, the parliamentary caucus leader Frank-Walter Steinmeier, and Peer Steinbrück, former minister-president of Nordrhein-Westfalen and former federal minister of Finance, were quasi-official contenders for the candidacy, incumbent Nordrhein-Westfalen minister-president Hannelore Kraft denied interest in the candidacy. Gabriel, Steinmeier, and Steinbrück all had a bad electoral record, as they all had led their party into painful defeats in state or general elections. Gabriel and Steinbrück lost their inherited minister-president offices in 2003 and 2005, and Steinmeier failed as a chancellor-candidate in 2009. On 28 September 2012, the party announced that Steinbrück would be the SPD's chancellor-candidate.

== Campaign ==
After taking heat domestically for bailing out other European countries, Finance-Minister Wolfgang Schäuble took the step of mentioning that Greece would need a third bailout. This was in stark contrast to his colleagues who had refrained from making such measures in light of the election, in particularly following Merkel's dismissal of a potential future bailout. In reaction to the statement and the dithering, Peer Steinbrueck of the SPD said that it was "time that Mrs. Merkel tells people the truth", while Jürgen Trittin of the Greens also criticized Merkel.

Merkel also became the first chancellor to visit Dachau concentration camp after an invitation by former inmate Max Mannheimer, who leads a survivor group, saying: "What happened at the concentration camps was and continues to be incomprehensible." Merkel also warning of a rising tide of antisemitism and racism as a threat to democracy in Europe. Her visit was welcomed by residents of the town due to its historic nature but was also suggested as a vote ploy ahead of the election. She also campaigned on Germany's unemployment record that fell to a two-decade low during her premiership, progress towards a balanced budget, and the Eurozone's advantages for Germany's exports. There were questions asked about her legacy and a potential heir to the party leadership. Campaigning in the "hot phase" ended on 21 September, as Merkel appealed to voters to support her against Eurosceptics.

=== Televised debates ===
A 90-minute televised debate between the lead candidates of the CDU/CSU and the SPD, the two leading contenders, was held on 1 September. The smaller-party top-ranking candidates Rainer Brüderle (FDP), Jürgen Trittin (Alliance 90/The Greens), and Gregor Gysi (The Left) held a separate debate on 2 September.

== Opinion polling ==
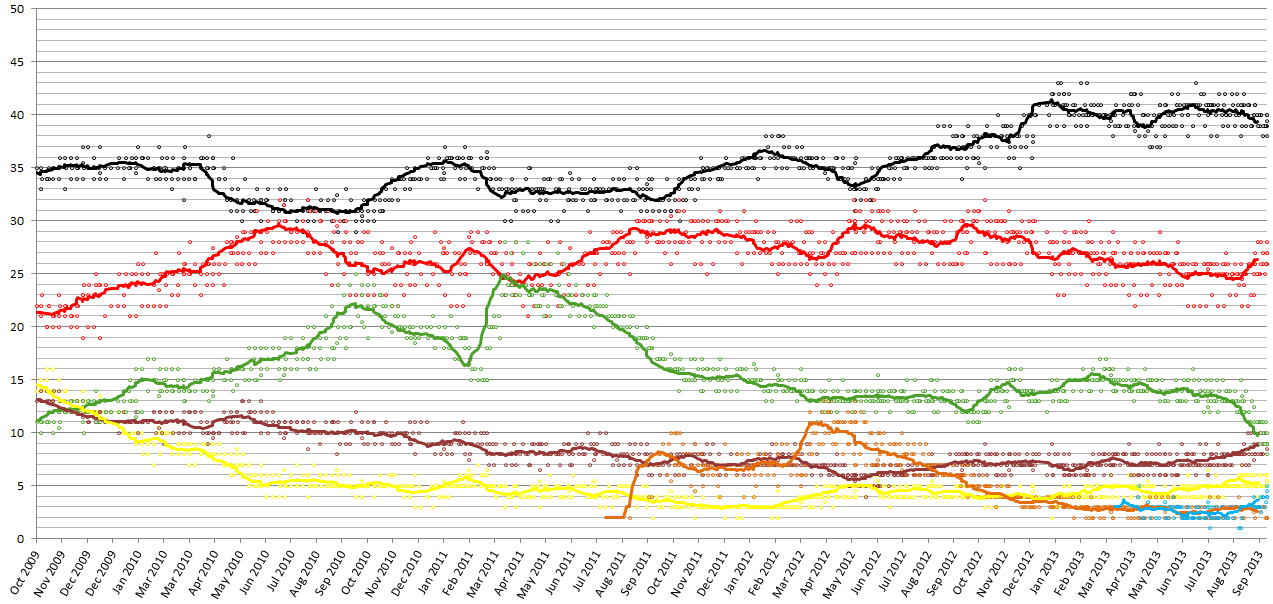
15-point average trend line of poll results from 2 October 2009 to 22 September 2013, with each line corresponding to a political party. CDU/CSU SPD FDP LINKE GRÜNE PIRATEN AfD

In Germany, there are regular opinion polls during the whole of the legislative period. Germany's major polling agencies are Allensbach, Emnid, Forsa, Forschungsgruppe Wahlen, GMS, Infratest dimap, and INSA/YouGov. August 2013 opinion polls suggested that the CDU/CSU and the FDP (black–yellow coalition) would be just short of or just above an absolute majority, rather than the SPD and Greens (red–green coalition), partners in Gerhard Schröder-led government (1998–2005).

== Results ==
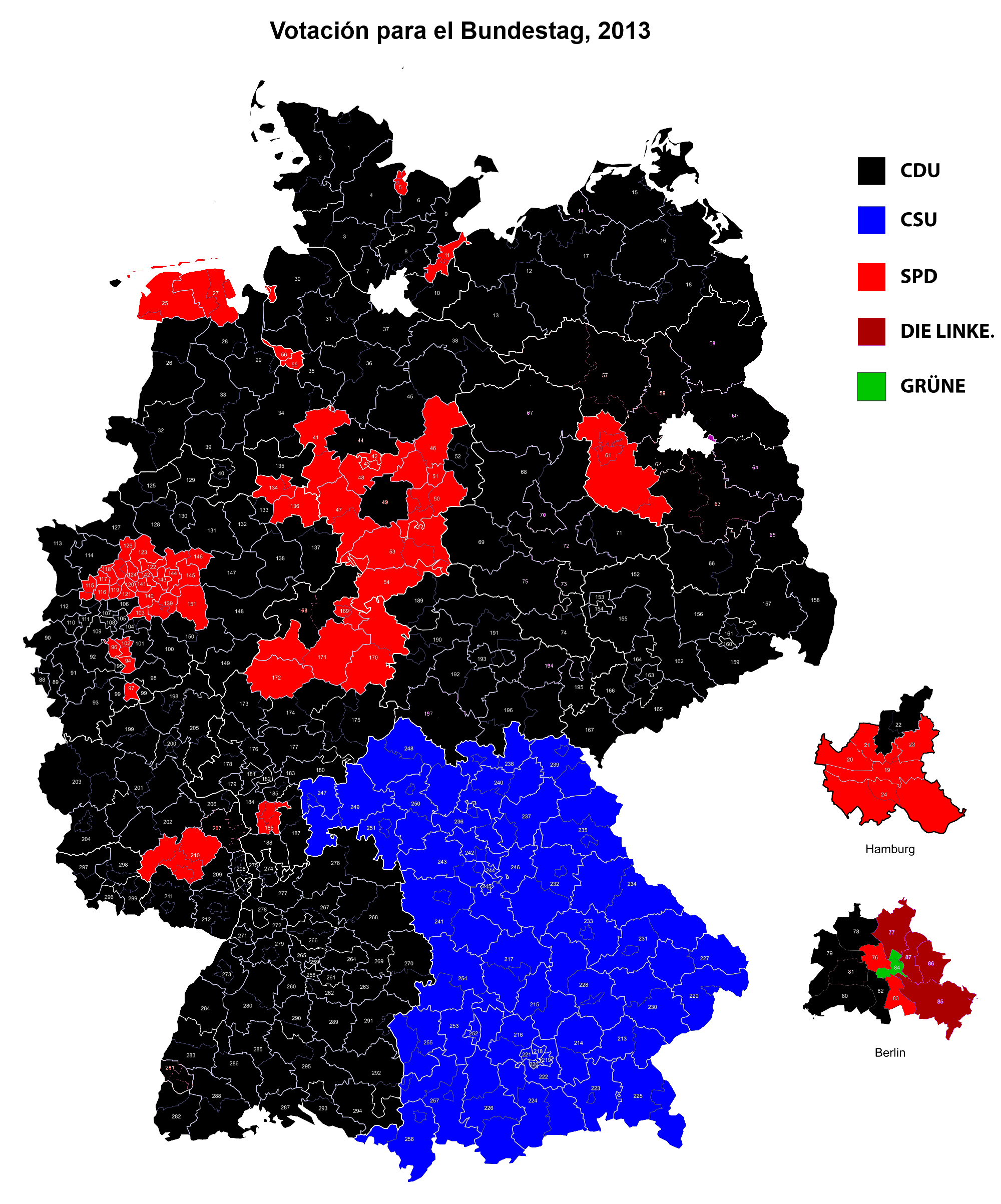
Parliamentary districts won by ■ – CDU ■ – CSU ■ – SPD ■ – The Left ■ – Greens

Results of the second vote by state

Only four parties were present in the Bundestag for the first time since the 1987 West German federal election, as the CDU/CSU operates as one Bundestag group. The Christian Democratic Union of Germany (CDU) and the Christian Social Union of Bavaria (CSU) scored 42 percent of the vote, their best result since tallying 44% in 1990. Since 15.7 percent of the vote went to parties that fell short of the 5% electoral threshold, the CDU/CSU came up just five seats short of a majority. The Free Democratic Party (FDP), junior partner in the outgoing coalition government, failed to pass the 5% threshold. It also failed to win any directly elected seats, as it has not won any directly elected seats since 1990, shutting it out of the Bundestag altogether for the first time in the party's history. A new Eurosceptic party, Alternative for Germany, nearly won seats but was shut out by narrowly missing the 5% electoral threshold.

Party	Party-list			Constituency			Total seats	+/–
Party	Votes	%	Seats	Votes	%	Seats	Total seats	+/–
Christian Democratic Union	14,921,877	34.13	64	16,233,642	37.21	191	255	+61
Social Democratic Party	11,252,215	25.73	135	12,843,458	29.44	58	193	+47
The Left	3,755,699	8.59	60	3,585,178	8.22	4	64	−12
Alliance 90/The Greens	3,694,057	8.45	62	3,180,299	7.29	1	63	−5
Christian Social Union	3,243,569	7.42	11	3,544,079	8.12	45	56	+11
Free Democratic Party	2,083,533	4.76	0	1,028,645	2.36	0	0	−93
Alternative for Germany	2,056,985	4.70	0	810,915	1.86	0	0	New
Pirate Party Germany	959,177	2.19	0	963,623	2.21	0	0	0
National Democratic Party	560,828	1.28	0	635,135	1.46	0	0	0
Free Voters	423,977	0.97	0	431,640	0.99	0	0	New
Human Environment Animal Protection Party	140,366	0.32	0	4,437	0.01	0	0	0
Ecological Democratic Party	127,088	0.29	0	128,209	0.29	0	0	0
The Republicans	91,193	0.21	0	27,299	0.06	0	0	0
Die PARTEI	78,674	0.18	0	39,388	0.09	0	0	0
Pro Germany Citizens' Movement	73,854	0.17	0	4,815	0.01	0	0	New
Bavaria Party	57,395	0.13	0	28,430	0.07	0	0	0
Democracy by Referendum	28,654	0.07	0	1,748	0.00	0	0	0
Pensioners' Party	25,134	0.06	0	920	0.00	0	0	0
Party of Reason	24,719	0.06	0	3,861	0.01	0	0	New
Marxist–Leninist Party	24,219	0.06	0	12,904	0.03	0	0	0
Party of Bible-abiding Christians	18,542	0.04	0	2,081	0.00	0	0	0
Alliance for Innovation and Justice	17,743	0.04	0	2,680	0.01	0	0	New
Bürgerrechtsbewegung Solidarität	12,814	0.03	0	17,988	0.04	0	0	0
Feminist Party	12,148	0.03	0				0	0
Party of the Non-voters	11,349	0.03	0				0	0
Alliance 21/RRP	8,578	0.02	0	5,324	0.01	0	0	0
The Violets	8,211	0.02	0	2,516	0.01	0	0	0
Family Party	7,449	0.02	0	4,478	0.01	0	0	0
Party for Social Equality	4,564	0.01	0				0	0
The Right	2,245	0.01	0				0	New
German Communist Party				1,699	0.00	0	0	0
Federation for a Complete Germany				1,431	0.00	0	0	0
Bergpartei, die "ÜberPartei"				624	0.00	0	0	New
NO! Idea				290	0.00	0	0	New
Independents and voter groups				77,306	0.18	0	0	0
Total	43,726,856	100.00	332	43,625,042	100.00	299	631	+9
Valid votes	43,726,856	98.68		43,625,042	98.45			
Invalid/blank votes	583,069	1.32		684,883	1.55			
Total votes	44,309,925	100.00		44,309,925	100.00			
Registered voters/turnout	61,946,900	71.53		61,946,900	71.53			
Source: Bundeswahlleiter

=== Results by state ===
Below are second votes (Zweitstimme, or votes for party list), by state.

State	CDU/CSU	SPD	LINKE	GRÜNE	FDP	AfD	Other
Baden-Württemberg	45.7	20.6	4.8	11.0	6.2	5.2	6.5
Bavaria	49.3	20.0	3.8	8.4	5.1	4.2	9.2
Berlin	28.5	24.6	18.5	12.3	3.6	4.9	7.6
Brandenburg	34.8	23.1	22.4	4.7	2.5	6.0	6.5
Bremen	29.3	35.7	10.1	12.1	3.4	3.7	5.7
Hamburg	32.2	32.4	8.8	12.6	4.8	4.1	5.1
Hesse	39.2	28.8	6.0	9.9	5.6	5.6	4.9
Mecklenburg-Vorpommern	42.5	17.8	21.5	4.3	2.2	5.6	6.1
Lower Saxony	41.1	33.1	5.0	8.8	4.2	3.7	4.1
North Rhine-Westphalia	39.8	31.9	6.1	8.0	5.2	3.9	5.1
Rhineland-Palatinate	43.3	27.5	5.4	7.6	5.5	4.8	5.9
Saarland	37.8	31.0	10.0	5.7	3.8	5.2	6.5
Saxony	42.6	14.6	20.0	4.9	3.1	6.8	8.0
Saxony-Anhalt	41.2	18.2	23.9	4.0	2.6	4.2	5.9
Schleswig-Holstein	39.2	31.6	5.2	9.4	5.6	4.6	4.4
Thuringia	38.8	16.1	23.4	4.9	2.6	6.2	8.0

CDU-CSU vote

SPD vote

Linke vote

Grüne vote

FDP vote

AfD vote

Piraten vote

NPD vote

==== Constituency seats ====
State	Total seats	Seats won				
State	Total seats	CDU	SPD	CSU	Linke	Grüne
Baden-Württemberg	38	38				
Bavaria	45			45		
Berlin	12	5	2		4	1
Brandenburg	10	9	1			
Bremen	2		2			
Hamburg	6	1	5			
Hesse	22	17	5			
Lower Saxony	30	17	13			
Mecklenburg-Vorpommern	6	6				
North Rhine-Westphalia	64	37	27			
Rhineland-Palatinate	15	14	1			
Saarland	4	4				
Saxony	16	16				
Saxony-Anhalt	9	9				
Schleswig-Holstein	11	9	2			
Thuringia	9	9				
Total	299	191	58	45	4	1

==== List seats ====
State	Total seats	Seats won				
State	Total seats	SPD	CDU	Grüne	Linke	CSU
Baden-Württemberg	40	20	5	10	5	
Bavaria	46	22		9	4	11
Berlin	15	6	4	3	2	
Brandenburg	10	4		1	5	
Bremen	4		2	1	1	
Hamburg	7		4	2	1	
Hesse	23	11	4	5	3	
Lower Saxony	36	12	14	6	4	
Mecklenburg-Vorpommern	7	3		1	3	
North Rhine-Westphalia	74	25	26	13	10	
Rhineland-Palatinate	16	9	2	3	2	
Saarland	5	3		1	1	
Saxony	17	6	1	2	8	
Saxony-Anhalt	10	4		1	5	
Schleswig-Holstein	13	7	2	3	1	
Thuringia	9	3		1	5	
Total	332	135	64	62	60	11

=== Reactions ===
Incumbent chancellor Angela Merkel said: "It was a strong vote to take responsibility in Germany, but also in Europe and the world." Peer Steinbrück announced his withdrawal from top politics and his intention to focus on his ordinary tasks as a member of parliament.

== Government formation ==
As in the red-baiting and Red Scare campaign ("red socks") during the 1994 German federal election, Merkel scared off that the alternative was a left-wing red–red–green coalition government, since the FDP lost all its seats. Many SPD insiders did not want to work with The Left. One day after the election, Merkel announced that she had already spoken with the SPD but would not rule out other possibilities. An opinion poll conducted shortly after the election showed that 65% of SPD members were opposed to entering a Merkel-led grand coalition; however, the SPD executive voted to enter coalition talks with the proviso that they would seek a vote from their membership before making a final agreement on entering a coalition. The Greens were open to coalition talks with the CDU/CSU, but CSU leaders said they opposed a coalition with the Greens. The Greens announced they would not consider going into coalition with the Left.

Formal talks began in the first week of October when Merkel met SPD leaders on 4 October. She said: "Europe is watching us, the world is watching us. We have the common responsibility to build a stable government." She also planned to hold talks with the Greens the following week. After five weeks of negotiations that culminated in an all-night session 27–28 November, the CDU/CSU reached agreement with the SPD to form a new coalition government. Issues resolved in the talks included the planned introduction of a minimum hourly wage of €8.50 in 2015 and no new taxes. The deal depended on approval by the SPD rank and file, with a poll set for 6 December. On 14 December, 76% of the SPD's members voted for the coalition to go ahead. The Third Merkel cabinet was sworn in on 17 December. This grand coalition continued after the 2017 German federal election.

== See also ==
- List of Bundestag constituencies
- Merkel-Raute – described by The Guardian as "probably one of the most recognisable hand gestures in the world", Angela Merkel's trademark has become a political symbol used by both her supporters and opponents.
