= Pantone Merkel =

Compilation of photos of Angela Merkel

The most widely distributed version of "Pantone" Merkel has 100 images of chancellor Angela Merkel arranged into a color chart.

The "Pantone Merkel", also known as the "many shades of Merkel" or "Merkel Rainbow", is a compilation of photos of Angela Merkel, former chancellor of Germany, collected by Dutch graphic designer Noortje van Eekelen. It consists of an overview of Merkel's jackets arranged into a chart by colour in a manner similar to the Pantone color chart. The "Pantone Merkel" also includes captions describing the locations and dates the photos were taken.

The series is composed of 100 different news photos of public moments and has become one of the most widely recognized symbols of Merkel, including many variations and imitations. The project went viral and gained considerable media attention via social media and was published by many international websites, magazines and newspapers, including The Guardian, The New York Times, and The Telegraph.

== Background ==
The Pantone Merkel was created as part of the project "The Spectacle of the Tragedy," a website with collected and repurposed images identifying the politicians who navigate the Eurozone crisis. The project was made as part of van Eekelen's Master of Design at the Sandberg Instituut Amsterdam, and is generally described as a satire of the crisis. The project approaches the Eurozone crisis through a wide variety of disciplines, such as fashion, art, design, journalism, politics, and economics. The purpose of The Spectacle of the Tragedy is to generate a platform to reflect on the euro crisis, by "[telling] a visual story about the politicians that navigate the Euro crisis" and giving readers "an insight into their irresponsible behavior". The project can be interpreted as an entertaining diversion and commentary on how our European leaders are trying to secure financial security in the eurozone.

In contrast to many female celebrities and public figures, Merkel is known for purchasing and repeatedly wearing her own formal clothes. In 2014 the newspaper Bild praised Merkel for attending a formal event in a tunic she had owned since at least 1996.

== Imitation ==
In (online) discussions, the "Pantone Merkel" is often compared to the "Diamond Jubilee Colour Guide" by Pantone and Leo Burnett London. The Pantone Merkel has been imitated several times by various parties, including Reuters and the German Bild; it has also been shown in different exhibitions and lectures. The artistic approach of the Pantone Merkel was followed by the Dutch image editor Frank Schallmaier, who reached a large audience in December 2013 with a series of photos called "De hand van Hollande".

== See also ==
- Merkel-Raute
